This is a complete alphabetic list of all players who won the Stanley Cup ice hockey trophy with years and total wins. The Stanley Cup was first awarded in 1893, and since 1926 it has been the championship trophy of the National Hockey League (NHL). The list includes all known players from each winning team from 1893 to 1923. Since 1924, all players whose names were actually engraved on the Stanley Cup are listed. The list also includes any player who qualified but whose name was not engraved on the Stanley Cup, and any player who did not qualify but who dressed in the playoffs

The rules for determining whether a player qualified to be listed as a Stanley Cup winner have changed over time:
 1893 to 1926 – played one game for the winning team during the regular season or the Stanley Cup playoffs, or included on the team picture;
 1926 to 1970 – played half of the regular season games (and was not traded to another team), or played one playoff game; Some players who qualified were left off the Stanley Cup, while other players who did not officially qualify were still included.
 1971 to 1976 – played in the playoffs (a player who played at least half of the regular season games and was left off the cup is included on this list);
 Since 1976 – appeared in at least one game in the Stanley Cup Finals, or half of the regular season games, and was still with the winning team after the NHL trade deadline. Between 1978 and 1993, eleven players who did not qualify still ended up having their name engraved on the Stanley Cup

Starting in 1994, teams have been permitted to petition the NHL Commissioner, to be considered on a case-by-case basis, to engrave a player's name on the cup if the player was unavailable to play due to "extenuating circumstances". Usually, players who spend the whole season with the winning team, but do not officially qualify, are included, especially if they missed many games injured. The league does not evaluate all players on the roster, only the ones requested by the winning team. NHL has rejected some requests for names to be added.

Since 1998, there has been a limit of 52 names per champion, counting both players and non-playing personnel. No players who qualify may be left off to include another non-playing member. The following list includes notes explaining each of the following situations:

 Any player who qualified, but whose name was left off the Stanley Cup, is included with information on how they qualified.
 Any player who did not officially qualify, but whose name was included on the Cup, is included with information about why their name was included.
 Any non-player who played in at least one game for the winning team that season is included with their position.
 Any player who dressed in the playoffs, or missed many games injured, but was left off the Stanley Cup, because they did not qualify is included.

– A – 
 Abel, Clarence "Taffy" – New York Rangers 1928; Chicago Black Hawks 1934 {2}
 Abel, Sid – Detroit Red Wings 1943-50-52 {3}
 Acer, Douglas – Montreal Victorias 1899 {1}
 Acton, Keith – Edmonton Oilers 1988 {1}
 Adams, Craig – Carolina Hurricanes 2006; Pittsburgh Penguins 2009 {2}
 Adams, Jack – Toronto Arenas 1918; Ottawa Senators 1927 {2} - 1927 - engraved as John J. Adams
 Adams, John M. – Boston Bruins 1970 {1} – 1970 – name was engraved on cup before playing in the NHL, spare goalie for the playoffs.
 Adams, Kevyn – Carolina Hurricanes 2006 {1}
 Aebischer, David – Colorado Avalanche 2001 {1}
 Afanasenkov, Dmitry – Tampa Bay Lightning 2004 {1}
 Aitkenhead, Andy – New York Rangers 1933 {1}
 Albelin, Tommy – New Jersey Devils 1995-2003 {2}
 Allen, Angus "Bones" – Ottawa Silver Sevens 1905 {1}
 Allen, Jake – St. Louis Blues 2019 {1}
 Allen, Keith "Bingo" – Detroit Red Wings 1954 {1}
 Anderson, Doug – Montreal Canadiens 1953 {1} – 1953 – Only 2 NHL games played (playoffs), qualified, but still left off cup.
 Anderson, Glenn – Edmonton Oilers 1984-85-87-88-90; New York Rangers 1994 {6}
 Anderson, John – Victoria Cougars 1925 {1}
 Andreychuk, Dave – Tampa Bay Lightning 2004 {1}
 Andrews, Lloyd - Toronto St. Pats 1922 {1}
 Annunen, Justus - Colorado Avanlche 2022 {1} - 2022 - dressed for 3 playoff games as back up goalie. Left off cup not dressing in the finals.
 Apps, Syl Sr. – Toronto Maple Leafs 1942-47-48 {3}
 Arbour, Al – Detroit Red Wings 1954; Chicago Black Hawks 1961; Toronto Maple Leafs 1962-64 {4} – 1964 – played 6 regular season games, 1 game in finals, qualified, but name is missing.
 Arbour, Amos – Montreal Canadiens 1916 {1}
 Archibald, Josh - Pittsburgh Penguins 2017 {1}
 Armytage, Jack "J.C." – Winnipeg Victorias 1896 {1}
 Armstrong, George – Toronto Maple Leafs 1962-63-64-67 {4}
 Arnott, Jason – New Jersey Devils 2000 {1}
 Ashbee, Barry – Philadelphia Flyers 1974 {1}
 Asmundson, Ossie – New York Rangers 1933 {1}
 Aubé-Kubel, Nicolas – Colorado Avalanche 2022 {1}
 Aurie, Larry – Detroit Red Wings 1936-37 {2}
 Awrey, Don – Boston Bruins 1970–72; Montreal Canadiens 1976 {3} – 1976 – played 72 regular season games, qualified, left off for not playing in the playoffs.

– B – 
 Babando, Pete – Detroit Red Wings 1950 {1}
 Babchuk, Anton – Carolina Hurricanes 2006 {1} – 39 regular season games 17 for Chicago, 22 for Carolina, did not play in the playoffs included for spending whole season in the NHL.
 Backor, Pete – Toronto Maple Leafs 1945 {1}
 Backstrom, Nicklas – Washington Capitals 2018 {1}
 Backstrom, Ralph – Montreal Canadiens 1959-60-65-66-68-69 {6}
 Bailey, Garnet "Ace" – Boston Bruins 1970-72 {2}
 Bailey, Irvine "Ace" – Toronto Maple Leafs 1932 {1}
 Bain, Dan – Winnipeg Victorias 1896-1901-02 {3}
 Balfour, Earl – Chicago Black Hawks 1961 {1}
 Balfour, Murray – Chicago Black Hawks 1961 {1}
 Balon, David – Montreal Canadiens 1965-66 {2}
 Barbashev, Ivan – St. Louis Blues 2019 {1}
 Barber, Bill – Philadelphia Flyers 1974-75 {2}
 Barilko, Bill – Toronto Maple Leafs 1947-48-49-51 {4}
 Barlow, Billy – Montreal AAA 1893-94 {2}
 Barrasso, Tom – Pittsburgh Penguins 1991-92 {2}
 Barry, Marty – Detroit Red Wings 1936-37 {2}
 Bathgate, Andy – Toronto Maple Leafs 1964 {1}
 Bauer, Bobby – Boston Bruins 1939-41 {2}
 Baun, Bob – Toronto Maple Leafs 1962-63-64-67 {4}
 Bawlf, Billy – Ottawa Silver Sevens 1905 {1}
 Beagle, Jay - Washington Capitals 2018 {1}
 Beauchemin, Francois – Anaheim Ducks 2007 {1}
 Beaudro, Roxy – Kenora Thistles 1907 {1}
 Belfour, Ed "Eagle" – Dallas Stars 1999 {1}
 Belanger, Jesse – Montreal Canadiens 1993 {1} - played 19 regular-season & 9 playoff game, no finals game. Did not qualify, but name was still included on cup.
 Beliveau, Jean – Montreal Canadiens 1956-57-58-59-60-65-66-68-69-71 {10}
 Bell, Billy – Montreal Canadiens 1924 {1}
 Bellingham, Billy "Turkey" – Montreal AAA 1902-03 {2}
 Bellows, Brian – Montreal Canadiens 1993 {1}
 Benedict, Clint – Ottawa Senators 1920-21-23; Montreal Maroons 1926 {4}
Bennett, Beau - Pittsburgh Penguins 2016 {1} - 2016 - played 33 regular season games, 1 game in Conference finals, injured 50 games, 15 playoff games - still left off cup no injury exemption.
 Benoit, Joe – Montreal Canadiens 1946 {1}
 Benson, Robert R. "Bobby" – Winnipeg 1896 {1}
 Bentley, Max – Toronto Maple Leafs 1948-49-51 {3}
 Berenson, Gordon "Red" – Montreal Canadiens 1965 {1}
 Bergeron-Cleary, Patrice – Boston Bruins 2011 {1}
 Berglund, Christian – New Jersey Devils 2003 {1} – 2003 – played 38 regular season games. Name was left off cup for playing in the minors after the trading deadline.
 Berlinquette, Louis – Montreal Canadiens 1916 {1}
Bernier, Jonathan – Los Angeles Kings 2012 {1}
 Beukeboom, Jeff – Edmonton Oilers 1987-88-90; New York Rangers 1994 {4}
 Bicek, Jiri – New Jersey Devils 2003 {1}
 Bickell, Bryan – Chicago Blackhawks 2010-13-15 {3} – 2010- played 16 regular season, 4 playoff games. Name was left off for not playing in the finals, spending majority of season in the minors
 Binnington, Jordan – St. Louis Blues 2019 {1}
 Blachford, Cecil – Montreal AAA 1903; Montreal Wanderers 1906-07-08-10 {5} - severed as coach while injured in 1906-07 seasons
 Black, Steve – Detroit Red Wings 1950 {1}
 Bladon, Tom – Philadelphia Flyers 1974-75 {2}
 Blair, Andy – Toronto Maple Leafs 1932 {1}
 Blais, Samuel – St. Louis Blues 2019 {1}
 Blake, Hector "Toe" – Montreal Maroons 1935; Montreal Canadiens 1944–46 {3}
 Blake, Rob – Colorado Avalanche 2001 {1}
 Blinco, Russ – Montreal Maroons 1935 {1}
 Bodnar, August "Gus" – Toronto Maple Leafs 1945-47 {2}
 Boesch, Garth – Toronto Maple Leafs 1947-48-49 {3}
 Bogosian, Zach - Tampa Bay Lightning 2020 {1}
 Boisvert, Serge – Montreal Canadiens 1986 {1}
 Boldirev, Ivan – Boston Bruins 1970 {1} – 1970 – name was engraved on cup, as spare for playoffs, before playing a game in the NHL.
 Bolland, Dave – Chicago Blackhawks 2010-13 {2}
 Bollig, Brandon – Chicago Blackhawks 2013 {1}	
 Bolton, Hugh – Toronto Maple Leafs 1951 {1} – 1951 – included on cup, but did not qualify – 12 regular season games played.
 Bombardir, Brad – New Jersey Devils 2000 {1}
 Bonin, Marcel – Detroit Red Wings 1955; Montreal Canadiens 1958-59-60 {4}
 Bonino, Nick – Pittsburgh Penguins 2016-17  {2}
 Boon, Dickie – Montreal AAA 1902–03 {2}
 Bordeleau, Christian – Montreal Canadiens 1969 {1}
 Bortuzzo, Robert – St. Louis Blues 2019 {1}
 Bossy, Mike – New York Islanders 1980-81-82-83 {4}
 Bouchard, Pierre – Montreal Canadiens 1971-73-76-77-78 {5}
 Bouchard, Emile "Butch" – Montreal Canadiens 1944-46-53-56 {4}
 Boucher, Billy – Montreal Canadiens 1924 {1}
 Boucher, Bobby – Montreal Canadiens 1924 {1}
 Boucher, Frank "Raffles" – New York Rangers 1928–33 {2}
 Boucher, George "Buck"  – Ottawa Senators 1920-21-23-27 {4}
 Boucher, Philippe – Pittsburgh Penguins 2009 {1}
 Bourgeault, Leo – New York Rangers 1928 {1}
 Bourne, Bob – New York Islanders 1980-81-82-83 {4}
 Bourque, Phil – Pittsburgh Penguins 1991–92 {2}
 Bourque, Raymond "Ray" – Colorado Avalanche 2001 {1}
 Boutilier, Paul – New York Islanders 1983 {1}
 Bouwmeester, Jay – St. Louis Blues 2019 {1}
 Bower, Johnny – Toronto Maple Leafs 1962-63-64-67 {4}
 Bowey, Madison - Washington Capitals 2018 {1}
 Bowie, Russell – Montreal Victorias 1899 {1}
 Bowman, Ralph "Scotty" – Detroit Red Wings 1936-37 {2}
 Boychuk, Johnny – Boston Bruins 2011 {1}
 Boyd, Billy – New York Rangers 1928 {1}
 Boyd, Travis - Washington Capitals 2018 {1} - 2018 - played 8 regular season games, 1 playoff game, rest of season in the minors, did not qualify to be on cup.
 Boyle, Dan – Tampa Bay Lightning 2004 {1}
 Boynton, Nick – Chicago Blackhawks 2010 {1}
 Bozak, Tyler – St. Louis Blues 2019 {1}
 Brannen, Jack – Montreal Shamrocks 1899–1900 {2}
 Brennan, Doug – New York Rangers 1933 {1}
 Brennon, John	– Montreal Shamrocks 1900 {1} - 1900 - dressed in the finals, but did not play.
 Brenneman, John – Toronto Maple Leafs 1967 {1} – 1967 - played 43 regular season games, qualified, but was left off for playing in the minors during the playoffs.
 Brewer, Carl – Toronto Maple Leafs 1962-63-64 {3}
 Brimsek, Frank – Boston Bruins 1939-41 {2}
  Brind'Amour, Rod – Carolina Hurricanes 2006 {1}
 Brisebois, Patrice – Montreal Canadiens 1993 {1}
 Broadbent, Harry "Punch" – Ottawa Senators 1920-21-23; Montreal Maroons 1926 {4}
 Broda, Walter "Turk" – Toronto Maple Leafs 1942-47-48-49-51 {5} - 1942 engraved twice once as Turk Broda & once as Water Broda
 Broden, Connie – Montreal Canadiens 1957-58 {2}
 Brodeur, Martin – New Jersey Devils 1995-2000-03 {3}
 Brookbank, Sheldon – Chicago Blackhawks 2013 {1}
 Brophy, Bernie – Montreal Maroons 1926 {1} - 1926 – played 10 regular season games, qualified, name was left off cup for not playing in the playoffs.
 Broten, Neal – New Jersey Devils 1995 {1}
 Brouwer, Troy – Chicago Blackhawks 2010 {1}
 Brown, Adam – Detroit Red Wings 1943 {1}
 Brown, Art – Winnipeg Victorias 1901–02 {2}
 Brown, Connie – Detroit Red Wings 1943 {1}
 Brown, Dave – Edmonton Oilers 1990 {1}
 Brown, Doug – Detroit Red Wings 1997–98 {2}
 Brown, Dustin – Los Angeles Kings 2012-14 {2} 
 Bruce, Morley – Ottawa Senators 1920-21 {2}
 Brule, Steve – New Jersey Devils 2000 {1} - Only playoff game played Conference Finals (2 NHL games in 2003 Colorado) included at New Jersey request.
 Brunet, Benoit – Montreal Canadiens 1993 {1}
 Bruneteau, Moderre "Mud" – Detroit Red Wings 1936-37-43 {3}
 Brylin, Sergei – New Jersey Devils 1995-2000-03 {3}
 Bryzgalov, Ilya – Anaheim Ducks 2007 {1}
 Buchberger, Kelly – Edmonton Oilers 1987-90 {2}
 Bucyk, John "Chief" – Boston Bruins 1970-72 {2}
 Bucyk, Randy - Montreal Canadiens 1986 {1}- 1986 - played 17 regular season games, 2 playoff games. Left off did not qualify
 Burakovsky, Andre - Washington Capitals 2018; Colorado Avalanche 2022 {2}
 Burish, Adam – Chicago Blackhawks 2010 {1}
 Burke, Marty – Montreal Canadiens 1930-31 {2}
 Byfuglien, Dustin – Chicago Blackhawks 2010 {1}
 Byram, Bowen – Colorado Avalanche 2022 {1}

– C – 
 Cadham, Fred – Winnipeg Victorias 1896; 1902-03 {3}
 Cain, Herb – Montreal Maroons 1935; Boston Bruins 1941 {2}
 Callander, William "Jock" – Pittsburgh Penguins 1992 {1}
 Callighen, Frank "Patsy" – New York Rangers 1928 {1}
 Cameron, Allan – Montreal AAA 1893–94 {2}
 Cameron, Billy – Montreal Canadiens 1924 {1}
 Cameron, Harry – Toronto Blue Shirts 1914; Toronto Arenas 1918; Toronto St. Pats 1922 {3}
 Campbell, Brian – Chicago Blackhawks 2010 {1}
 Campbell, Gregory – Boston Bruins 2011 {1}
 Campbell Colin J. "Tote" – Winnipeg Victorias 1896 {1}
 Carbonneau, Guy – Montreal Canadiens 1986–93; Dallas Stars 1999 {3}
 Carcillo, Daniel - Chicago Blackhawks 2013-15 {2} - 2015 - only played 38 regular season games, given injury exemption at Chicago request.
 Carey, George – Quebec Bulldogs 1912 {1}
 Carleton, Wayne – Boston Bruins 1970 {1}
 Carlson, John - Washington Capitals 2018 {1}
 Carpenter, Bob Jr. – New Jersey Devils 1995 {1}
 Carpenter, Everard "Ed" – Seattle Metropolitans 1917 {1}
 Carr, Lorne – Toronto Maple Leafs 1942–45 {2}
 Carroll, Billy – New York Islanders 1981-82-83; Edmonton Oilers 1985 {4}
 Carson, Frank "Frosty" – Montreal Maroons 1926 {1}
 Carson, Gerry – Montreal Canadiens 1930 {1}
 Carson, Bill "Doc" – Boston Bruins 1929 {1}
 Carter, Jeff – Los Angeles Kings 2012-14 {2}
 Carter, Ryan – Anaheim Ducks 2007 {1}
 Carveth, Joe – Detroit Red Wings 1943-50 {2}
 Cashman, Wayne – Boston Bruins 1970-72 {2}
 Caufield, Jay – Pittsburgh Penguins 1991-92 {2} – 1991 – Only played 23 regular season games, included on cup for spending whole season with Pittsburgh.
 Cernak, Erik - Tampa Bay Lightning 2020-21 {2}
 Chabot, Lorne – New York Rangers 1928; Toronto Maple Leafs 1932 {2}
 Chamberlain, Erwin "Murph" – Montreal Canadiens 1944–46 {2}
 Chambers, Shawn – New Jersey Devils 1995; Dallas Stars 1999 {2}
 Chara, Zdeno – Boston Bruins 2011 {1}
 Chartraw, Rick – Montreal Canadiens 1976-77-78-79; Edmonton Oilers 1984 {5} – 1984 –  24 regular season games, 4 games for NY Rangers, & 20 games for Edmonton, plus 1 playoff game for Edmonton.  Left off for not play in the finals, spending 1/2 season in the minors.
 Cheevers, Gerry – Boston Bruins 1970-72 {2}
 Chelios, Chris – Montreal Canadiens 1986; Detroit Red Wings 2002-08 {3}
 Chiasson, Alex - Washington Capitals 2018 (1)
 Chipcase, William "Bill" – Montreal Wanderers 1907-10 {2} - 1907 dressed in the finals but did not play.
 Chorske, Tom – New Jersey Devils 1995 {1}
 Chychrun, Jeff – Pittsburgh Penguins 1992 {1}
 Cibak, Martin – Tampa Bay Lightning 2004 {1}
 Cirelli, Anthony - Tampa Bay Lightning 2020-21 {2}
 Cleary, Daniel – Detroit Red Wings 2008 {1}
 Clancy, Frank "King" – Ottawa Senators 1923-27; Toronto Maple Leafs 1932 {3}
 Clapper, Aubrey "Dit" – Boston Bruins 1929-39-41 {3}
 Clarke, Bob – Philadelphia Flyers 1974–75 {2}
 Cleghorn, Ogilivie "Odie' – Montreal Canadiens 1924 {1}
 Cleghorn, Sprague – Ottawa Senators 1920-21; Montreal Canadiens 1924 {3}
 Clement, Bill – Philadelphia Flyers 1974-75 {2}
 Clifford, Kyle – Los Angeles Kings 2012-14 {2}
 Clymer, Ben – Tampa Bay Lightning 2004 {1}
 Coburn, Braydon - Tampa Bay Lightning 2020 {1}
 Coffey, Paul – Edmonton Oilers 1984-85-87; Pittsburgh Penguins 1991 {4}
 Coflin, Hugh – Detroit Red Wings 1952 {1} – 1952 – Never played for Detroit, included on cup as a spare for the playoffs. NHL does not recognize him as Stanley Cup winner.
 Cogliano, Andrew – Colorado Avalanche 2022 {1}
 Cole, Danton – New Jersey Devils 1995 {1}
 Cole, Erik – Carolina Hurricanes 2006 {1}
 Cole, Ian - Pittsburgh Penguins 2016-17 {2}
 Coleman, Blake - Tampa Bay Lightning 2020-21 {2}
 Collins, Herb – Montreal AAA 1894 {1}
 Colton, Ross – Tampa Bay Lightning 2021 {1}
 Colville, Mac – New York Rangers 1940 {1}
 Colville, Neil – New York Rangers 1940 {1}
 Commodore, Mike – Carolina Hurricanes 2006 {1}
 Compher, J.T. – Colorado Avalanche 2022 {1}
 Conacher, Brian – Toronto Maple Leafs 1967 {1}
 Conacher, Charlie “The Big Bomber” – Toronto Maple Leafs 1932 {1}
 Conacher, Lionel “The Big Train” – Chicago Black Hawks 1934; Montreal Maroons 1935 {2}
 Conacher, Pat – Edmonton Oilers 1984 {1}
 Conacher, Roy – Boston Bruins 1939-41 {2}
 Connell, Alex – Ottawa Senators 1927; Montreal Maroons 1935 {2}
 Connelly, Bert – Chicago Black Hawks 1938 {1} – 1938 – played 15 regular season games, 1 playoff game, qualified, but left off.
 Connolly, Brett - Washington Capitals 2018 {1}
 Connor, Cam – Montreal Canadiens 1979 {1}
 Cook, Fred "Bun" – New York Rangers 1928-33 {2}
 Cook, Lloyd – Vancouver Millionaires 1915 {1}
 Cook, Tom – Chicago Black Hawks 1934 {1}
 Cook, Bill – New York Rangers 1928-33 {2}
 Cooke, Matt – Pittsburgh Penguins 2009 {1}
 Corbeau, Bert – Montreal Canadiens 1916 {1}
 Corbeau, Con – Toronto Blueshirts 1914 {1}
 Corbet, Rene – Colorado Avalanche 1996 {1}
 Costello, Les – Toronto Maple Leafs 1948 {1}
 Cotton, Harold "Badly" – Toronto Maple Leafs 1932 {1}
 Coughlin, Jack – Toronto Arenas 1918 {1}
 Coulter, Art – Chicago Black Hawks 1934; New York Rangers 1940 {2}
 Cournoyer, Yvan "Roadrunner" - Montreal Canadiens 1965-66-68-69-71-73-76-77-78-79 {10} – 1979 – only played 18 games injured, names was included on the cup.
 Courtnall Geoff – Edmonton Oilers 1988 {1}
 Coutu, Wilfred "Bill" – Montreal Canadiens 1924 {1}
 Couture, Gerry "Doc" – Detroit Red Wings 1950 {1}
 Couture, Rosie "Lolo" – Chicago Black Hawks 1934 {1}
 Cowick, Bruce – Philadelphia Flyers 1974 {1}
 Cowley, Bill "Cowboy" – Boston Bruins 1939-41 {2}
 Crawford, Corey – Chicago Blackhawks 2013-15 {2}
 Crawford, Jack – Boston Bruins 1939-41 {2}
 Crawford, Rusty – Quebec Bulldogs 1913; Toronto Arenas 1918 {2}
 Creighton, Billy – Quebec Bulldogs 1913 {1}
 Crisp, Terry – Philadelphia Flyers 1974-75 {2}
 Crosby, Sidney "Sid the Kid" - Pittsburgh Penguins 2009-16-17 {3}
 Cullen, Matt – Carolina Hurricanes 2006; Pittsburgh Penguins 2016-17 {3}
 Cullimore, Jassen – Tampa Bay Lightning 2004 {1}
 Cumiskey, Kyle - Chicago Blackhawks 2015 {1}
 Currie, Alex – Ottawa Senators 1911 {1}
 Curry, Floyd – Montreal Canadiens 1953-56-57-58 {4}
 Cushenan, Ian – Montreal Canadiens 1959 {1}

– D – 
 Dahlin, Kjell – Montreal Canadiens 1986 {1}
 Dahlstrom, Carl "Cully" – Chicago Black Hawks 1938 {1}
 Daigneault, Jean-Jacques "J.J." – Montreal Canadiens 1993 {1}
 Daley, Trevor - Pittsburgh Penguins 2016-17 {2}
 Damphousse, Vincent – Montreal Canadiens 1993 {1}
 Dandenault, Mathieu – Detroit Red Wings 1997-98-2002 {3}
 Daneyko, Ken – New Jersey Devils 1995-2000-03 {3}
 Daniels, Jeff – Pittsburgh Penguins 1992  – 1992 – only played 2 games, did not qualify name is on cup, spent rest of the regular season in the minors, was recalled during the playoffs.
 Darling, Scott - Chicago Blackhawks 2015 {1}
 Darragh, Hal – Toronto Maple Leafs 1932 {1}
 Darragh, Jack – Ottawa Senators 1911-20-21-23 {4}
 Datsyuk, Pavel – Detroit Red Wings 2002-08 {2}
 Davidson, Allan "Scotty" – Toronto Blueshirts 1914 {1}
 Davidson, Cam – Montreal Victorias 1896-97-98-99 {4}
 Davidson, Bob	– Toronto Maple Leafs 1942-45 {2}
 Davidson, Shirley – Montreal Victorias 1895-96-97 {3}
 Davis, Lorne – Montreal Canadiens 1953 {1}
 Dawes, Bob – Toronto Maple Leafs 1949 {1}
 Day, Clarence "Hap" – Toronto Maple Leafs 1932 {1}
 Deadmarsh, Adam – Colorado Avalanche 1996 {1}
 Dean, Kevin – New Jersey Devils 1995 {1}
 DeBlois, Lucien – Montreal Canadiens 1986 {1}
 Del Zotto, Michael - St. Louis Blues 2019 {1} - played 42 regular season games 23 for Vancouver, 12 for Anaheim & 7 for St. Louis. Did not play in the playoffs, included for spending whole season in the NHL.
 Denneny, Corbett "Corb" – Toronto Arenas 1918; Toronto St. Pats 1922 {2}
 Denneny, Cyril "Cy" – Ottawa Senators 1920-21-23-27; Boston Bruins 1929 {5} – 1929 – playing coach for Boston.
 DeJordy, Denis – Chicago Black Hawks 1961 {1} – 1961 – Name was put on cup, before playing first NHL game, spare goalie for the playoffs.
 Delvecchio, Alex – Detroit Red Wings 1952-54-55 {3}
 Desjardins, Andrew - Chicago Blackhawks 2015 {1}
 Desjardins, Eric – Montreal Canadiens 1993 {1}
 Devereaux, Boyd – Detroit Red Wings 2002 {1}
 de Vries, Greg – Colorado Avalanche 2001 {1}
 Dewsbury, Al – Detroit Red Wings 1950 {1}
 Dey, Edgar Jr. – Ottawa Senators 1909 {1}
 Dickens, Ernie – Toronto Maple Leafs 1942 {1}
 Dillon, Cecil – New York Rangers 1933 {1}
 Dineen, Bill – Detroit Red Wings 1954-55 {2}
 Dingman, Chris – Colorado Avalanche 2001; Tampa Bay Lightning 2004 {2}
 Dinsmore, Chuck "Dinny" – Montreal Maroons 1926 {1}
 Dion "Coo" – Ottawa Silver Sevens 1906 {1}
 Dionne, Gilbert – Montreal Canadiens 1993 {1}
 DiPenta, Joe – Anaheim Ducks 2007 {1}
 DiPietro, Paul – Montreal Canadiens 1993 {1}
 Djoos, Christian - Washington Capitals 2018 {1}
 Doak, Gary – Boston Bruins 1970 {1}
Dobby, John – Montreal Shamrocks 1899 {1}
 Dornhoefer, Gary – Philadelphia Flyers 1974-75 {2}
 Doughty, Drew – Los Angeles Kings 2012-14 {2}
 Douglas, Kent – Toronto Maple Leafs 1963-64-67 {3} – 1964, 1967 – played half the regular season games, but left off cup for playing in the minors during the playoffs.
Douglas, Les – Detroit Red Wings 1943 {1}
 Dowd, Jim – New Jersey Devils 1995 {1}
 Downey, Aaron – Detroit Red Wings 2008 {1}
 Drake, Dallas – Detroit Red Wings 2008 {1}
 Draper, Kris – Detroit Red Wings 1997-98-2002-08 {4}
 Drewiske, Davis – Los Angeles Kings 2012 {1} – 2012 – play 9 regular season games, included for spending the whole season with LA.
 Drinkwater, Graham – Montreal Victorias 1895-96-97-98-99 {5}
 Drillon, Gord – Toronto Maple Leafs 1942 {1}
 Driver, Bruce – New Jersey Devils 1995 {1}
 Drury, Chris – Colorado Avalanche 2001 {1}
 Dryden, Ken – Montreal Canadiens 1971-73-76-77-78-79 {6}
 Dube, Gilles – Detroit Red Wings 1954 {1}
 Duchesne, Steve – Detroit Red Wings 2002 {1}
 Duff, Dick – Toronto Maple Leafs 1962-63; Montreal Canadiens 1965-66-68-69 {6}
 Dufresne, Donald – Montreal Canadiens 1993 {1}
 Dumart, Woody "Porky" – Boston Bruins 1939-41 {2}
 Dumoulin, Brian - Pittsburgh Penguins 2016-17 {2}
 Dunn, Vince – St. Louis Blues 2019 {1}
 Dupont, Andre – Philadelphia Flyers 1974-75 {2}
 Dupuis, Pascal – Pittsburgh Penguins 2009-16 {2} - 2016 - only played 18 games and forced to retire on Dec. 8 because of several blood clots still included at Pittsburgh's request. 
 Durnan, Bill – Montreal Canadiens 1944-46 {2}
 Dye, Cecil "Babe" – Toronto St. Pats 1922 {1}
 Dykstra, Steve – Edmonton Oilers 1988 {1} – 1988 – played 42 regular season games, but name left off the Stanley Cup because he split his time with 27 for Buffalo, & 15 for Edmonton.

– E – 
 Eager, Ben – Chicago Blackhawks 2010 {1}
 Eaton, Mark – Pittsburgh Penguins 2009 {1}
 Ebbs, Jack – Ottawa Silver Sevens 1906 {1}
 Eddolls, Frank – Montreal Canadiens 1946 {1}
 Edmundson, Joel – St. Louis Blues 2019 {1}
 Edwards, Allan "Roy" – Chicago Black Hawks 1961 {1}  – 1961 – name was engraved on the cup as a spare goalie for the playoffs, before playing first NHL game. Never played a game for Chicago.
 Ehman, Gerry – Toronto Maple Leafs 1964 {1}
 Eller, Lars - Washington Capitals 2018 {1}
 Elias, Patrik – New Jersey Devils 2000-03 {2}
 Elliot, Ronald – Montreal Victorias 1895; Montreal AAA 1902 {2}
 Ellis, Ron – Toronto Maple Leafs 1967 {1}
 Elmer, Wally – Victoria Cougars 1925 {1}
 Emery, Ray – Chicago Blackhawks 2013 {1}
 Engblom, Brian – Montreal Canadiens  1977-78-79 {3} – 1977 – played 2 playoff games. Left off for not playing in the finals, spending the rest of season in the minors.
 Erickson, Aut – Toronto Maple Leafs 1967 {1}
 Eriksson, Anders – Detroit Red Wings 1998 {1}
 Errey, Bob – Pittsburgh Penguins 1991-92 {2}
 Eskrine, Thomas - Montreal Wanderers 1907 {1} - included on both team pictures, but name was left off the Stanley Cup.  Never played for Wanderers, but dressed in the Finals.
 Esposito, Tony – Montreal Canadiens 1969 {1}
 Esposito, Phil – Boston Bruins 1970-72 {2}
 Evans, Jack "Tex" – Chicago Black Hawks 1961 {1}
 Evans, Stewart – Montreal Maroons 1935 {1}
 Ewen, Todd – Montreal Canadiens 1993 {1}
  Ewing, Jack – Montreal Victorias 1897-98-99 {3}
 Ezinicki, Bill – Toronto Maple Leafs 1947-48-49 {3}

– F – 
 Fabbri, Robert – St. Louis Blues 2019 {1}
 Farrell, Art – Montreal Shamrocks 1899-1900 {2}
 Fedorov, Sergei – Detroit Red Wings 1997-98-2002 {3}
 Fedotenko, Ruslan – Tampa Bay Lightning 2004; Pittsburgh Penguins 2009 {2}
 Fehr, Eric – Pittsburgh Penguins 2016 {1}
 Ferguson, John Sr. – Montreal Canadiens 1965-66-68-69-71 {5}
 Fenwick, Art – Montreal Victorias 1895 {1}
 Ference, Andrew – Boston Bruins 2011 {1}
 Fetisov, Viacheslav "Slava" – Detroit Red Wings 1997-98 {2}
 Fillion, Bob – Montreal Canadiens 1944-46 {2}
 Filppula, Valtteri – Detroit Red Wings 2008 {1}
 Finnie, Dave – Ottawa Silver Sevens 1905 {1}
 Finnigan, Frank – Ottawa Senators 1927; Toronto Maple Leafs 1932 {2}
 Fiset, Stephane – Colorado Avalanche 1996 {1}
 Fischer, Jiri – Detroit Red Wings 2002 {1}
 Fisher, Joe – Detroit Red Wings 1943 {1}
 Flaman, Fern – Toronto Maple Leafs 1951 {1}
 Fleming, Reg – Chicago Black Hawks 1961 {1}
 Flett, Bill – Philadelphia Flyers 1974 {1}
 Flett, Magnus – Winnipeg Victorias 1901-02 {2}
 Flett, Rod – Winnipeg Victorias 1896-1901-02 {3}
 Fleury, Marc-Andre – Pittsburgh Penguins 2009-16-17 {3}
 Fleury, Theoren – Calgary Flames 1989 {1}
 Fogolin, Lido "Lee Sr." – Detroit Red Wings 1950 {1}
 Fogolin, Lee Jr. – Edmonton Oilers 1984-85 {2}
 Foote, Adam – Colorado Avalanche 1996-2001 {2}
 Foote, Callan – Tampa Bay Lightning 2021 {1}
 Forsberg, Peter – Colorado Avalanche 1996-2001 {2}
 Fournier, Jack – Montreal Canadiens 1916 {1}
 Foyston, Frank – Toronto Blueshirts 1914; Seattle Metropolitans 1917; Victoria Cougars 1925 {3}
 Francis, Ron – Pittsburgh Penguins 1991-92 {2}
 Francouz, Pavel – Colorado Avalanche 2022 {1}
 Franks, Jimmy – Detroit Red Wings 1937 {1}
 Franzen, Johan – Detroit Red Wings 2008 {1}
 Fraser, Arthur – Ottawa Silver Sevens 1903 {1}
 Fraser, Colin – Chicago Blackhawks 2010; Los Angeles Kings 2012 {2}
 Fraser, Gord – Victoria Cougars 1925 {1}
 Fredrickson, Frank – Victoria Cougars 1925; Boston Bruins 1929 {2} – 1929 – a member of Pittsburgh Pirates when Boston won the Stanley Cup, but name was added in 1958. NHL recognizes Fredrickson as only winning 1 Stanley Cup.
 Friesen, Jeff – New Jersey Devils 2003 {1}
 Frolik, Michael – Chicago Blackhawks 2013 {1}
 Frost, Harry – Boston Bruins 1939 {1}
 Fuhr, Grant – Edmonton Oilers 1984-85-87-88-90 {5}

– G – 
 Gaborik, Marian – Los Angeles Kings 2014 {1}
 Gagne, Simon – Los Angeles Kings 2012 {1}
 Gagnon, Johnny – Montreal Canadiens 1931 {1}
 Gainey, Bob – Montreal Canadiens 1976-77-78-79-86 {5}
 Gainor, Norman "Dutch" – Boston Bruins 1929; Montreal Maroons 1935 {2}
 Galbraith, Percy – Boston Bruins 1929 {1}
 Gallagher, John – Detroit Red Wings 1937 {1}
 Gamble, Dick – Montreal Canadiens 1953 {1}
 Gardner, Cal – Toronto Maple Leafs 1949-51 {2}
 Gardiner, Chuck – Chicago Black Hawks 1934 {1}
 Gardner, Jimmy – Montreal AAA 1902-03; Montreal Wanderers 1908-10 {4}
 Garon, Mathieu – Pittsburgh Penguins 2009 {1}
 Garruthers, George – Winnipeg Victorias 1901 {1}
 Gatherum, Dave – Detroit Red Wing: 1954 {1} – 1954 Only played 3 regular season games; served as spare goaltender for playoffs, name still on Cup.
 Gaul, Horace – Ottawa Silver Sevens 1905-Ottawa Senators 1911 {2}
 Gauthier, Jean – Montreal Canadiens 1965 {1}
 Gee, George – Detroit Red Wings 1950 {1}
 Gelinas, Martin – Edmonton Oilers 1990 {1}
 Geoffrion, Bernie "Boom Boom" – Montreal Canadiens 1953-56-57-58-59-60 {6}
 Gerard, Eddie – Ottawa Senators 1920-21-23; Toronto St. Pats 1922 {4}
 Gerber, Martin – Carolina Hurricanes: 2006 {1}
 Gersich, Shane - Washington Capitals 2018 {1} - 2018 - played 3 regular season games, 1 playoff game, left off for not playing in the finals, spending rest of the season in the minors
 Getliffe, Ray – Boston Bruins 1939; Montreal Canadiens 1944 {2}
 Getzlaf, Ryan – Anaheim Ducks 2007 (1)
 Giguere, Jean-Sebastien "J.S." – Anaheim Ducks 2007 {1}
 Gilbert, Greg – New York Islanders 1982-83; New York Rangers 1994 {3} - 1982 - played 1 regular and 4 playoff games, did not qualify, but name was put on cup.
 Gilchrist, Brent – Detroit Red Wings 1998 {1}
 Gill, Hal – Pittsburgh Penguins 2009 {1}
 Gilhen, Randy – Pittsburgh Penguins 1991 {1}
 Gillilan, Dave – Montreal Victorias 1896-97 {2}
 Gillies, Clark – New York Islanders 1980-81-82-83 {4}
 Gilmour, Dave – Ottawa Silver Sevens 1903 {1}
 Gilmour, Doug – Calgary Flames: 1989 {1}
 Gilmour, Hamilton "Billy" – Ottawa Silver Sevens 1903-04-05-06-Ottawa Senators 1909 {5}
 Gilmour, Larry – Montreal Wanderers 1908 {1}
 Gilmour Suddy – Ottawa Silver Sevens 1903-04 {2}
 Gingras, Gaston – Montreal Canadiens 1986 {1}
 Gingras, Tony – Winnipeg Victorias 1901-02 {2}
 Gionta, Brian – New Jersey Devils 2003 {1}
 Girard, Samuel – Colorado Avalanche 2022 {1}
 Giroux, Eddie – Kenora Thistles 1907 {1}
 Glass, Frank "Pud" – Montreal Wanderers 1906-07-08-10 {4}
 Glover, Fred – Detroit Red Wings 1952 {1}
 Godard, Eric - Pittsburgh Penguins 2009 {1}
 Goldham, Bob – Toronto Maple Leafs 1942-47; Detroit Red Wings 1952-54-55 {5} – 1947 – 11 regular season games played injured, so name was included.
 Goldsworthy, Leroy – Chicago Black Hawks 1934 {1}
 Goldup, Hank – Toronto Maple Leafs 1942 {1}
 Goligoski, Alex – Pittsburgh Penguins 2009 {1}
 Gomez, Scott – New Jersey Devils 2000-03 {2}
 Gonchar, Sergei – Pittsburgh Penguins 2009 {1}
 Goodenough, Larry – Philadelphia Flyers 1975 {1}
 Goodman, Paul – Chicago Black Hawks 1938 {1}
 Goodrow, Barclay - Tampa Bay Lightning 2020-21 {2}
 Goodfellow, Ebbie – Detroit Red Wings 1936-37-43 {3} – 1943 – 11 regular season games played injured, so name was included. Served as coach while Jack Adams was suspended during the playoffs.
 Goring, Robert "Butch" – New York Islanders 1980-81-82-83 {4}
 Gorman, Ed – Ottawa Senators 1927 {1}
 Gottselig, Johnny – Chicago Black Hawks 1934-38 {2}
 Gourde, Yanni - Tampa Bay Lightning 2020-21 {2}
 Goyette, Phil – Montreal Canadiens 1957-58-59-60 {4}
 Gracie, Bob – Toronto Maple Leafs 1932; Montreal Maroons 1935 {2}
 Grahame, John – Tampa Bay Lightning 2004 {1}
 Grannery, Jack – Quebec Bulldogs 1912 {1}
 Grant, Danny – Montreal Canadiens 1968 {1}
 Grant, Mike – Montreal Victorias 1895-96-97-98-99 {5}
 Graves, Adam – Edmonton Oilers 1990; New York Rangers 1994 {2}
 Gray, Alex – New York Rangers 1928 {1}
 Gregg, Randy – Edmonton Oilers 1984-85-87-88-90 {5}
 Green, Red – Boston Bruins 1929 {1}
 Green, Rick – Montreal Canadiens 1986 {1}
 Green, Edward "Ted" – Boston Bruins 1970-72 {2} – 1970 – Missed whole season injured, but name was included on cup.
 Greene, Matt – Los Angeles Kings 2012-14 {2}
 Grenier, Lucien – Montreal Canadiens 1969 {1} – 1969 – played 2 playoff games, qualified, but name was left off cup.
 Gretzky, Wayne "Great One" – Edmonton Oilers 1984-85-87-88 {4}
 Griffis, Silas "Si" – Kenora Thistles 1907; Vancouver Millionaires 1915 {2}
 Grosso, Don – Detroit Red Wings 1943 {1}
 Grubauer, Phillipp - Washington Capitals 2018 {1}
 Guentzel, Jake – Pittsburgh Penguins 2017 {1}
 Guerin, Bill – New Jersey Devils 1995; Pittsburgh Penguins 2009 {2}
 Gunnarsson, Carl – St. Louis Blues 2019 {1}
 Gusarov, Alexei – Colorado Avalanche 1996 {1}

– H – 
 Hagelin, Carl - Pittsburgh Penguins 2016-17 {2}
 Hague, Billy – Ottawa Silver Sevens 1906 {1}
 Haidy, Gord – Detroit Red Wings 1950 {1} – 1950 – Only NHL game played Semi-Finals qualified, but name was left off.
 Hainsey, Ron - Pittsburgh Penguins 2017 {1}
 Hainsworth, George – Montreal Canadiens 1930-31 {2}
 Halderson, Harold – Victoria Cougars 1925 {1}
 Hall, Glenn "Mr. Goalie" – Detroit Red Wings 1952; Chicago Black Hawks 1961 {2} – 1952 – name was engraved on cup as a spare goalie, before playing an NHL game.
 Hall, Joe – Kenora Thistles 1907; Quebec Bulldogs 1912-13 {3} – 1907 dressed in finals but did not play.
 Haller, Kevin – Montreal Canadiens 1993 {1}
 Halliday, Milton – Ottawa Senators 1927 {1}
 Hallin, Mats – New York Islanders 1983 {1}
 Hamill, Robert "Red" – Boston Bruins 1939 {1}
 Hamilton, Reg – Toronto Maple leafs 1942-45 {2} – 1942 – only played 22 regular season games injured, so name was included.
 Handzuš, Michal – Chicago Blackhawks: 2013 (1)
 Hanna, Dave – Edmonton Oilers 1988; Colorado Avalanche 1996 {2}
 Harmon, Glen  – Montreal Canadiens 1944-46 {2}
 Harper Terry – Montreal Canadiens 1965-66-68-69-71 {5}
 Harris, Edward "Ted" – Montreal Canadiens 1965-66-68-69; Philadelphia Flyers 1975 {5} - Engraved as Edward in 1965-66-68-69, Ted in 1975.
 Harris, Bill "Hinke" – Toronto Maple Leafs: 1962-63-64 {3}
Harriston, James – Toronto Blue Shirts 1914 {1}
 Hart, Harold "Gizzy" – Victoria Cougars 1925 {1}
 Hartigan, Mark – Anaheim Ducks: 2007; Detroit Red Wings: 2008 (2) – 2007 played 6 regular season games, 4 playoff games, 2008 played 23 regular season games, 1 playoff game. Left off Stanley Cup in 2007 and 2008, for not playing in the finals, spending most of the season in the minors
 Hartman, Mike – New York Rangers 1994 {1} – 1994 – only played 35 regular season games injured, so name was added cup.
 Harvey, Doug – Montreal Canadiens 1953-56-57-58-59-60 {6}
 Hasek, Dominik "Dominator" – Detroit Red Wings 2002-08 (2)
 Hassard, Bob – Toronto Maple Leafs 1951 {1} – 1951 – only played 12 regular season games, did not qualify, but put on cup.
 Hatcher, Derian – Dallas Stars 1999 {1}
 Hay, Bill  – Chicago Black Hawks 1961 {1}		
 Hay, Jim –  Detroit Red Wings 1955 {1}
 Hayes, Chris – Boston Bruins 1972 {1} – 1972 – Only NHL game played finals qualifying, but name is missing.
 Healy, Glenn –  New York Rangers 1994 {1}
 Hefferman, Gerry – Montreal Canadiens 1944 {1}
 Hedman, Victor - Tampa Bay Lightning 2020-21 {2}
 Hedican, Bret – Carolina Hurricanes 2006 {1}
 Hejduk, Milan – Colorado Avalanche 2001 {1}
 Heller, Ehrhardt "Ott" – New York Rangers 1933-40 {2}
 Helman, Harry – Ottawa Senators 1923 {1}
 Helm, Darren – Detroit Red Wings 2008; Colorado Avalanche 2022 {2}
 Henderson, Harold – Montreal Victorias 1895-96-97 {3}
 Hendry, Jordan – Chicago Blackhawks 2010 {1}
 Henning, Lorne – New York Islanders 1980-81 {2} – 1981 – played 9 regular season games and 1 playoff game while serving as an assistant coach.
 Hern, Riley – Montreal Wanderers 1906-07-08-10 {4}
 Hextall, Bryan Sr. – New York Rangers 1940 {1}
 Hicke, Bill – Montreal Canadiens 1959-60 {2}
 Hicks, Wayne – Chicago Black Hawks 1961 {1}
 Higginbotham, Fred – Winnipeg Victorias 1896 {1}
 Hill, Mel –  Boston Bruins 1939-41; Toronto Maple Leafs 1945 {3}
 Hill, Sean – Montreal Canadiens 1993 {1}
 Hillier, Randy Pittsburgh Penguins 1991 {1}
 Hiller, Wilbert "Dutch" – Boston Bruins 1941; Montreal Canadiens 1946 {2}
 Hillman, Larry - Detroit Red Wings 1955; Toronto Maple Leafs 1962-63-64-67; Montreal Canadiens 1969 {6} – 1955 - Youngest player to win the Stanley Cup - 1962, 1963 – played only 3 & 5 regular season games, spent rest of season in minors but name on cup.
 Hillman, Wayne – Chicago Black Hawks 1961 {1}
 Hinote, Dan – Colorado Avalanche 2001 {1}
 Hitchman, Lionel – Ottawa Senators 1923; Boston Bruins 1929 {2}
 Hjalmarsson, Niklas – Chicago Blackhawks 2010-13-15 {3}
 Hnidy Shane – Boston Bruins 2011 {1} – Left off only playing 3 regular season, & 3 playoff games.
 Hodge, Charlie - Montreal Canadiens 1956-58-59-60-65-66 {6} – 1956 did not play for Montreal, 1958-59-60 sub played very few games, included as a spare goalie for the playoffs.
 Hodge, Ken Sr. – Boston Bruins 1970-72 {2}
 Hodge, Tom – Montreal AAA 1902-03 {2}
 Hodgson, Archie  – Montreal AAA 1893-94 {2}
 Hodson, Kevin – Detroit Red Wings 1997–98 {2} –  1997 – only played 6  regular season games, dressed for 23 games spent the whole season with Detroit so name was included.
 Hogue, Benoit – Dallas Stars 1999 {1}
 Holtby, Braden - Washington Capitals 2018 {1}
 Holik, Bobby – New Jersey Devils 1995-2000 {2}
 Hollet, Bill "Flash" – Boston Bruins 1939-41 {2}
 Holmes, Harry "Hap" – Toronto Blue Shirts 1914; Seattle Metropolitans 1917; Toronto Arenas 1918; Victoria Cougars 1925 {4}
 Holmstrom, Tomas – Detroit Red Wings 1997-98-2002-08 {4}
 Holota, Johnny – Detroit Red Wings 1943 {1} – 1943 – only played 13 regular season games, did not qualify, but name was added to cup.
 Holway, Albert "Toots" - Montreal Maroons 1926 {1}
 Hooper, Art – Montreal AAA 1902-03 {2}
Hooper. Tom – Kenora Thistles 1907; Montreal Wanderers 1908 {2}
 Horne, George "Shorty" – Montreal Maroons 1926 {1} – 1926 – played 13 regular season games, qualified to be on cup, left off for not playing in the playoffs.
 Horner, Charlies – Montreal Shamrocks 1899-1900 {2} – 1900 dressed in finals, but did not play.
 Horner, Reginald "Red" – Toronto Maple Leafs 1932 {1}
 Hornqvist, Patric - Pittsburgh Penguins 2016-17 {2}
 Horton, Nathan – Boston Bruins 2011 {1}
 Horton, Miles "Tim" – Toronto Maple Leafs 1962-63-64-67 {4}
 Hossa, Marian – Chicago Blackhawks 2010-13-15 {3}
 Houle, Rejean – Montreal Canadiens 1971-73-77-78-79 {5}
 Howard, Tom "Attie" – Winnipeg Victorias 1896 {1}
 Howatt, Garry – New York Islanders 1980-81 {2}
 Howe, Gordie "Mr. Hockey" – Detroit Red Wings 1950-52-54-55 {4}
 Howe, Syd – Detroit Red Wings 1936-37-43 {3}
 Hrdina, Jiri – Calgary Flames 1989; Pittsburgh Penguins 1991-92 {3}
 Hrkac, Tony – Dallas Stars 1999 {1}
 Huddy, Charlie – Edmonton Oilers 1984-85-87-88-90 {5}
 Hudler, Jiri – Detroit Red Wings 2008 {1}
 Hudson, Mike – New York Rangers 1994 {1}
 Huet, Cristobal – Chicago Blackhawks 2010 {1}
 Hughes, Pat – Montreal Canadiens 1979; Edmonton Oilers 1984-85 {3}
 Hull, Bobby "Golden Jet" – Chicago Black Hawks 1961 {1}
 Hull, Brett "Golden" – Dallas Stars 1999; Detroit Red Wings 2002 {2}
 Hutton, Carter – Chicago Blackhawks 2013 {1} – 2013 – played one regular season game, dressed for 1st 5 playoffs games, but did not play. Name left cup off for not dressing during the finals.
 Hunter, Dave – Edmonton Oilers 1984-85-87 {3}
 Hunter, Mark – Calgary Flames 1989 {1}
 Hunter, Tim - Calgary Flames 1989 {1}
 Huskins, Kent – Anaheim Ducks 2007 {1}
 Hutchinson, Andrew – Carolina Hurricanes 2006{1} – 2006 – played 36 regular season games, included spending the whole season with Carolina.
 Hutton, John "Bouse" – Ottawa Silver Sevens 1903-04 {2}
 Hyland, Harry – Montreal Wanderers 1910 {1}

– I – 
 Irving, Alex  – Montreal AAA 1893-94 {2}

– J – 
Jackman, Ric  – Anaheim Ducks 2007 {1}
Jackson, Art – Boston Bruins 1941; Toronto Maple Leafs 1945 {2}
Jackson, Don – Edmonton Oilers 1984-85 {2}
Jackson, Harold "Hal" – Chicago Black Hawks 1938; Detroit Red Wings 1943 {2} – 1938 – played 3 regular season games, and 1 playoff game, qualified, still left off.
Jackson, Harvey "Busher" – Toronto Maple Leafs 1932 {1}
Jackson, Stan – Toronto Maple Leafs 1922 {1}
Jagr, Jaromir – Pittsburgh Penguins 1991-92 {2}
James, George – Montreal AAA 1894 {1}
Jarry, Tristan - Pittsburgh Penguins 2016-17 {2} - 2016 - dressed for first 2 playoff games.  Left off, had not played an NHL game, or dressed in the finals - 2017 - played final regular season game, dressed for 11 playoffs games (did not play) left off for only playing 1 game, not dressing in finals. 
Jarvis, Doug  – Montreal Canadiens 1976-77-78-79 {4}
Jennings, Grant – Pittsburgh Penguins 1991-92 {2}
Jenkins, Roger "Broadway" – Chicago Black Hawks 1934-38 {2}
Jeffrey, Larry – Toronto Maple Leafs 1967 {1}
Jerabek, Jakub - Washington Capitals 2018 {1} - played 25 games for Montreal, 11 games & 2 playoff games for Washington, did not qualify.  
Johnson, Erik – Colorado Avalanche 2022 {1}
Johnson, Ernie "Moose" – Montreal Wanderers 1906-07-08-10 {4}
Johnson, Ivan "Ching" – New York Rangers 1928-33 {2}
Johnson, Jack – Colorado Avalanche 2022 {1}
Johnson, Tom  – Montreal Canadiens 1953-56-57-58-59-60 {6}
Johnson, Tyler - Tampa Bay Lightning 2020-21 {2}
Johnson, Earl "Ching" – Detroit Red Wings 1954 {1} – 1954 – Only played 1 NHL game, did not qualify, or play in the playoffs, played rest of career in minors, name on cup.
Johnson, Virgil – Chicago Black Hawks 1938 {1}
Johnston, Eddie – Boston Bruins 1970-72 {2}
Johnstone, Charles – Winnipeg Victorias 1896-01-02 {3}
Johnstone, Ross – Toronto Maple Leafs 1945 {1}
Joliat, Aurel – Montreal Canadiens 1924-30-31 {3}
Jones, Robert – Montreal Victorias 1895–96 {2}
Jones, Martin - Los Angeles Kings 2014 {1}
Jonsson, Tomas – New York Islanders 1982-83 {2}
Joseph, Mathieu - Tampa Bay Lightning 2020-21 {2}
Juzda, Bill – Toronto Maple Leafs 1949-51 {2}

– K – 
 Kaberle, Frantisek – Carolina Hurricanes 2006 {1}
 Kaberle, Tomas – Boston Bruins 2011 {1}
 Kadri, Nazem – Colorado Avalanche 2022 {1}
 Kallur, Anders – New York Islanders 1980-81-82-83 {4}
 Kampfer, Steven - Boston Bruins 2011 {1} - 2011 - played 38 regular season games, missed several games injured. Left off for playing 2/5 of the season in the minors, and not playing in the playoffs.
 Kamensky, Valeri – Colorado Avalanche 1996 {1}
 Kampman, Rudolph "Bingo" – Toronto Maple Leafs 1942 {1}
 Kane, Patrick – Chicago Blackhawks 2010-13-15 {3}
 Karakas, Mike – Chicago Black Hawks 1938 {1}
 Karpovtsev, Alexander – New York Rangers 1994 {1}
 Keane, Mike – Montreal Canadiens 1993; Colorado Avalanche 1996; Dallas Stars 1999 {3}
 Keeling, Melville "Butch" – New York Rangers 1933 {1}
 Keith, Duncan – Chicago Blackhawks 2010-13-15 {3}
 Kelly, Bob – Philadelphia Flyers 1974-75 {2}
 Kelly, Chris – Boston Bruins 2011 {1}
 Kelly, Leonard "Red" – Detroit Red Wings 1950-52-54-55; Toronto Maple Leafs 1962-63-64-67 {8}
 Kelly, Pete – Detroit Red Wings 1936-37 {2}
 Kelly Steve – New Jersey Devils 2000 {1}
 Kempny, Michal - Washington Capitals 2018 {1}
 Kendall, Bill – Chicago Black Hawks 1934 {1}
 Kennedy, Rod – Montreal Wanderers 1906-07 {2}
 Kennedy, Ted "Teeder" – Toronto Maple Leafs 1945-47-48-49-51 {5}
 Kennedy, Tyler – Pittsburgh Penguins 2009 {1}
 Keon Dave – Toronto Maple Leafs 1962-63-64-67 {4}
 Kerr, Albert "Dubbie" – Ottawa Senators 1909-10-11 {3}
 Kerr, Dave – New York Rangers 1940 {1}
 Kessel, Phil - Pittsburgh Penguins 2016-17 {2}
 Khabibulin, Nikolai – Tampa Bay Lightning 2004 {1}
 Killorn, Alex - Tampa Bay Lightning 2020-21 {2}
 Kilrea Hector "Hec" – Ottawa Senators 1927; Detroit Red Wings 1936-37 {3}
 Kilrea, Wally – Detroit Red Wings 1936-37 {2}
 Kindrachuk, Orest – Philadelphia Flyers 1974-75 {2}
 King, Dwight – Los Angeles Kings 2012-14 {2}
 Kingan, Alex – Montreal AAA 1893-94 {2}
 Kitchen, Chapman "Hobie" – Montreal Maroons 1926 {1} - 1926 – played 30 regular season games, qualified, name left off for not playing in the playoffs.
 Klein Lloyd – Boston Bruins 1929 {1}
 Klima, Petr – Edmonton Oilers 1990 {1}
 Klemm, Jon – Colorado Avalanche 1996-2001 {2}
 Knuble, Mike – Detroit Red Wings 1998 {1}
 Klukay, Joe – Toronto Maple Leafs 1947-48-49-51 {4}
 Kocur Joey –	New York Rangers 1994; Detroit Red Wings 1997-98 {3}
 Konstantinov, Vladimir – Detroit Red Wings 1997-98 {2} – 1998 – missed season due to a career ending injury, included on cup.
 Kopecky, Tomas – Detroit Red Wings 2008; Chicago Blackhawks 2010 {2}
 Kopitar, Anze – Los Angeles Kings 2012-14 {2}
 Kordic, John – Montreal Canadiens 1986 {1}
 Kovalev, Alexei – New York Rangers 1994 {1}
 Kozlov, Vyacheslav "Slava" – Detroit Red Wings 1997-98 {2}
 Krejci, David – Boston Bruins 2011 {1}
 Kronwall, Niklas – Detroit Red Wings 2008 {1}
 Krüger, Marcus – Chicago Blackhawks 2013-15 {2}
 Krupp, Uwe – Colorado Avalanche 1996; Detroit Red Wings 2002 {2} - 2002 - missed over 60 games injured, played 8 regular season & 2 playoff games, no injury exemption.
 Krushelnyski, Mike – Edmonton Oilers 1985-87-88 {3}
 Kubina, Pavel – Tampa Bay Lightning 2004 {1}
 Kucherov, Nikita - Tampa Bay Lightning 2020-21 {2}
 Kuemper, Darcy – Colorado Avalanche 2022 {1}
 Kuhnhackl, Tom - Pittsburgh Penguins 2016-17 {2}
 Kunitz, Chris – Anaheim Ducks 2007; Pittsburgh Penguins 2009-16-17 {4}
 Kurri, Jari – Edmonton Oilers 1984-85-87-88-90 {5}
 Kurvers, Thomas – Montreal Canadiens 1986 {1}
 Kuznetsov, Evgeny - Washington Capitals 2018 {1}
 Kuznetsov, Maxim – Detroit Red Wings 2002 {1} – 2002 – played 39 regular season games, spent whole season with Detroit. Not request as an extra player.
 Kypreos, Nick – New York Rangers 1994 {1}

– L – 
Lach, Elmer – Montreal Canadiens 1944-46-53 {3}
Lacombe, Normand – Edmonton Oilers 1988 {1}
Ladd, Andrew – Carolina Hurricanes 2006; Chicago Blackhawks 2010 {2}
Lafleur, Guy "The Flower" – Montreal Canadiens 1973-76-77-78-79 {5}
Lake, Fred – Ottawa Senators 1909-10-11 {3}
Lalonde, Edouard “Newsy” – Montreal Canadiens 1916 {1} – 1916 – playing coach
Lalor, Mike – Montreal Canadiens 1986 {1}
Lamb, Mark – Edmonton Oilers 1990 {1}
Lambert, Yvon – Montreal Canadiens 1976-77-78-79 {4}
Lamoureux, Leo – Montreal Canadiens 1944-46 {2}
Landeskog, Gabriel – Colorado Avalanche 2022 {1}
Lane, Gord – New York Islanders 1980-81-82-83 {4}
Lane, Myles – Boston Bruins 1929 {1}
Langelle, Pete – Toronto Maple Leafs 1942 {1}
Langenbrunner, Jamie – Dallas Stars 1999; New Jersey Devils 2003 {2}
Langevin, Dave – New York Islanders 1980-81-82-83 {4}
Langlois, Albert – Montreal Canadiens 1958-59-60 {3}
Langway, Rod – Montreal Canadiens 1979 {1}
Laperriere, Jacques – Montreal Canadiens 1965-66-68-69-71-73 {6}
Lapointe, Guy – Montreal Canadiens 1971-73-76-77-78-79 {6}
Lapointe, Martin – Detroit Red Wings 1997-98 {2}
Larionov, Igor – Detroit Red Wings 1997-98-2002 {3}
Larmer, Steve – New York Rangers 1994 {1}
Larochelle, Wildor – Montreal Canadiens 1930-31 {2}
Larocque, Michel – Montreal Canadiens 1976-77-78-79 {4}
Larose, Chad – Carolina Hurricanes 2006 {1}
Larose, Claude - Montreal Canadiens 1965-66-68-71-73 {5}
Larouche, Pierre – Montreal Canadiens 1978-79 {2}
Laviolette, Jack – Montreal Canadiens 1916 {1}
Leach, Jamie – Pittsburgh Penguins 1992 {1} – 1992 – played 38 regular season games, included for spending whole season with Pittsburgh.
Leach, Reggie – Philadelphia Flyers 1975 {1}
Lebeau, Stephan – Montreal Canadiens 1993 {1}
Lebda, Brett – Detroit Red Wings 2008 {1}
Lecavalier, Vincent – Tampa Bay Lightning 2004 {1}
LeClair, John "Jackie" - Montreal Canadiens 1956-57 {2} – 1957 – played 47 regular season games, qualified, but name was left off for playing in minors during the playoffs.
LeClair, John – Montreal Canadiens 1993 {1}
Leddy, Nick – Chicago Blackhawks 2013 {1}
Leduc, Albert – Montreal Canadiens 1930-31 {2}
Leeman, Gary – Montreal Canadiens 1993 {1}
Leetch, Brian – New York Rangers 1994 {1}
Lefebvre, Sylvain – Colorado Avalanche 1996 {1}
Lefley, Chuck – Montreal Canadiens 1971-73 {2}
Legace, Manny – Detroit Red Wings 2002 {1}
Lehkonen, Artturi – Colorado Avalanche 2022 {1}
Lehman, Hugh – Vancouver Millionaires 1915 {1}
Lehtinen, Jere – Dallas Stars 1999 {1}
Lemaire, Jacques – Montreal Canadiens 1968-69-71-73-76-77-78-79 {8}
Lemay, Maurice "Moe" – Edmonton Oilers 1987 {1}
Lemieux, Claude – Montreal Canadiens 1986; New Jersey Devils 1995-2000; Colorado Avalanche 1996 {4}
Lemieux, Mario "Super" – Pittsburgh Penguins 1991-92 {2}
Leonard, George – Quebec Bulldogs 1912 {1}
Lepine, Alfred "Pit" – Montreal Canadiens 1930-31 {2}	
Leschyshyn, Curtis – Colorado Avalanche 1996 {1}
Lesieur, Art – Montreal Canadiens 1931 {1}
LeSueur, Percy – Ottawa Senators 1909-10-11 {3}
Lesuk, Bill – Boston Bruins 1970 {1}
Leswick, Jack – Chicago Black Hawks 1934 {1}
Leswick, Tony – Detroit Red Wings 1952-54-55 {3}
Letang, Kris – Pittsburgh Penguins 2009-16-17 {3}
Levinsky, Alex – Toronto Maple Leafs 1932; Chicago Black Hawks 1938 {2}
Lewicki, Dannny – Toronto Maple Leafs 1951 {1}
Lewis, Gordon – Montreal Victorias 1896-97-98-99 {4}
Lewis, Trevor – Los Angeles Kings 2012-14 {2}
Lewis, Herbie – Detroit Red Wings 1936-37 {2}
Lidstrom, Nicklas – Detroit Red Wings 1997-98-2002-08 {4}
Lidster, Doug – New York Rangers 1994; Dallas Stars 1999 {2} – 1999 – played 17 regular season & 4 playoff games (played in the conference finals), name left off for not playing in the finals, spending most of season with Canadian National Team
Liffiton, Charles – Montreal AAA 1902-03 {2}
Liffiton, Ernie – Montreal Wanderers 1908 {1}
Lilja, Andreas – Detroit Red Wings 2008 {1}
Lindsay, Ted – Detroit Red Wings 1950-52-54-55 {4}
Lindstrom, Willy – Edmonton Oilers 1984-85 {2}
Linseman, Ken – Edmonton Oilers 1984 {1}
Liscombe, Carl – Detroit Red Wings 1943 {1}
Litzenberger, Ed – Chicago Black Hawks 1961; Toronto Maple Leafs 1962-63-64 {4} – 1964 – played 19 regular season games, 1 game in finals, qualified, still left off.
Loktionov. Andrei – 2012 Los Angeles Kings {1} – 2012 - played 39 regular season games, 2 playoff games. Left off for playing 1/2 season in the minors and not playing in the finals.
Loney, Troy – Pittsburgh Penguins 1991-92 {2}
Lonsberry, Ross – Philadelphia Flyers 1974-75 {2}
Loob, Hakan – Calgary Flames 1989 {1}
Lorentz, Jim – Boston Bruins 1970 {1}
Lorimer, Bob – New York Islanders 1980-81 {2}
Loughlin, Clem – Victoria Cougars 1925 {1}
Lovejoy, Ben – Pittsburgh Penguins 2016 {1}
Lowe, George "Bunny" – Montreal AAA 1893 {1}
Lowe, Kevin – Edmonton Oilers 1984-85-87-88-90; New York Rangers 1994 {6}
Lucic, Milan – Boston Bruins 2011 {1}
Ludwig, Craig – Montreal Canadiens 1986; Dallas Stars 1999 {2}
Lukowich, Brad – Dallas Stars 1999; Tampa Bay Lightning 2004 {2} – 1999 – played 14 regular season & 8 playoff games (4 in the conference finals). Left off for not playing in the finals, spending most of season in the minors
Lumley, David – Edmonton Oilers 1984-85 {2}
Lumley, Harry – Detroit Red Wings 1950 {1}
Lupien, Gilles – Montreal Canadiens 1978-79 {2}
Lynn, Vic – Toronto Maple Leafs 1947-48-49 {3}

– M – 
Maatta, Olli – Pittsburgh Penguins 2016-17 {2} 
MacAdam, Al – Philadelphia Flyers 1974 {1} – 1974 – played in 5 regular season games, 1 playoff games, qualified, but left off.
MacDermid, Kurtis – Colorado Avalanche 2022 {1}
MacDonald, Kilby – New York Rangers 1940 {1}
MacInnis, Al – Calgary Flames 1989 {1}
MacKay, Calum – Montreal Canadiens 1953 {1}
MacKay, Duncan "Mickey" – Vancouver Millionaires 1915; Boston Bruins 1929 {2}
MacKell, Fleming – Toronto Maple Leafs 1949-51 {2}
MacKell, Jack – Ottawa Senators 1920-21 {2}
MacKenzie, Bill – Montreal Maroons 1935, Chicago Black hawks 1938 {2} – 1935 – name was included on cup in 1935, but was member of New York Rangers. NHL says MacKenzie only won 1 Stanley Cup.
Mackie, Howie – Detroit Red Wings 1937 {1}
MacKinnon, Nathan – Colorado Avalanche 2022 {1}
MacLean, John – New Jersey Devils 1995 {1}
MacLeish, Rick – Philadelphia Flyers 1974-75 {2}
MacLellan, Brian – Calgary Flames 1989 {1}
MacMillan, John – Toronto Maple Leafs 1962-63 {2}
Macoun, Jamie – Calgary Flames 1989; Detroit Red Wings 1998 {2}
MacPherson, James "Bud" – Montreal Canadiens 1953 {1}
MacTavish, Craig – Edmonton Oilers 1987-88-90; New York Rangers 1994 {4}
Madden, John – New Jersey Devils 2000-03; Chicago Blackhawks 2010 {3}
Mahovlich, Frank "Big M"– Toronto Maple Leafs 1962-63-64-67; Montreal Canadiens 1971–73 {6}
Mahovlich, Peter "Little M"– Montreal Canadiens 1971-73-76-77 {4}
Majeau, Fern – Montreal Canadiens 1944 {1}
Makar, Cale – Colorado Avalanche 2022 {1}
Maki, Ronald "Chico" – Chicago Black Hawks 1961 {1}
Malakhov, Vladimir – New Jersey Devils 2000 {1}
Maley, David – Montreal Canadiens 1986 {1}
Mallen, Ken – Ottawa Senators 1910; Vancouver Millionaires 1915 {2}
Malkin, Evgeni – Pittsburgh Penguins 2009-16-17 {3}
Malone, Jeff – Quebec Bulldogs 1913 {1}
Malone, Joe "Phantom"  – Quebec Bulldogs 1912-13 {2}
Maltby, Kirk – Detroit Red Wings 1997-98-2002-08 {4}
Manson, Josh – Colorado Avalanche 2022 {1}
Mantha, Georges – Montreal Canadiens 1930-31 {2}
Mantha, Sylvio – Montreal Canadiens 1924-30-31 {3}
Marcetta, Milan – Toronto Maple Leafs 1967 {1}
March, Harold "Mush" – Chicago Black Hawks 1934-38 {2}
Marchand, Brad – Boston Bruins 2011 {1}
Marchant, Todd – Anaheim Ducks 2007 {1}
Marcotte, Don – Boston Bruins 1970-72 {2}
Marini, Hector – New York Islanders 1981-82 {2} – 1982 – only played 30 regular season games, included for spending the whole season with Islanders.
Marker, August "Gus" – Montreal Maroons 1935 {1}
Marks, Jack – Quebec Bulldogs 1912-13; Toronto 1918 {3}
Maroon, Patrick – St. Louis Blues 2019; Tampa Bay Lightning 2020-21 {3}
Marshall, Grant – Dallas Stars 1999; New Jersey Devils 2003 {2}
Marshall, Jack – Winnipeg Victorias 1901; Montreal AAA 1902–03; Montreal Wanderers 1907–10; Toronto Blue Shirts 1914 {6} – 1914 – playing Manager.
Marshall, Don – Montreal Canadiens 1956-57-58-59-60 {5}
Martin Clare – Detroit Red Wings 1950 {1}
Martinez, Alec – Los Angeles Kings 2012-14 {2}
Masnick, Paul – Montreal Canadiens 1953 {1}
Matteau, Stephane – New York Rangers 1994 {1}
Matvichuk, Richard – Dallas Stars 1999 {1}
 Matz, Jean "Johnny" – Vancouver Millionaires 1915 {1}
May, Brad – Anaheim Ducks 2007 {1}
Mayers Jamal – Chicago  Blackhawks 2013 {1} – 2013 – played 19 of 48 games, included on cup at Chicago request for spending whole season with the team. 
Mazur, Eddie – Montreal Canadiens 1953 {1}
McAlpine, Chris – New Jersey Devils 1995 {1}
McElhinney, Curtis - Tampa Bay Lightning 2020-21 {2}
McCaffrey, Bret – Montreal Canadiens 1930-31 {2} – 1931 – played half of the regular season games, left off for playing in the minors during the playoffs.
McCarty, Darren – Detroit Red Wings 1997-98-2002-08 {4}
McClelland, Kevin – Edmonton Oilers 1984-85-87-88 {4}
McCool, Frank – Toronto Maple Leafs 1945 {1}
McCormack, John – Toronto Maple Leafs 1951; Montreal Canadiens 1953 {2} - 1951 - played in the minors during the playoffs. Included on the cup for playing 47 games for Toronto.
McCreedy, John – Toronto Maple Leafs 1942-45 {2}
McCrimmon, Brad – Calgary Flames 1989 {1}
McDonagh, Ryan - Tampa Bay Lightning 2020-21 {2}
McDonald - Ottawa Silver Sevens 1905 {1} - First Name unknown
McDonald, Alvin "Ab" – Montreal Canadiens 1958-59-60; Chicago Black Hawks 1961 {4}
McDonald, Andy – Anaheim Ducks 2007 {1}
McDonald, Jack – Quebec Bulldogs 1912 {1}
McDonald, Lanny – Calgary Flames 1989 {1}
McDonald, Wilfred "Bucko" – Detroit Red Wings 1936-37; Toronto Maple leafs 1942 {3}
McDougall, Hartland – Montreal Victorias 1895-96-97-98 {4}
McDougall, Bob – Montreal Victorias 1895-96-97-98-99 {5}
McEachern, Shawn – Pittsburgh Penguins 1992 {1}
McEwen, Mike – New York Islanders 1981-82-83 {3}
McFadden, Jim – Detroit Red Wings 1950 {1}
McFadyen, Don – Chicago Black Hawks 1934 {1}
McLea, Ernest – Montreal Victorias 1896-97-98-99 {4}
McGee, Frank "One Eye" – Ottawa Silver Sevens 1903-04-05-06 {4}
McGee, Jim – Ottawa Silver Sevens 1904 {1}
McGiffen, Roy – Toronto Blueshirts 1914 {1}
McGimsie, Billy – Kenora Thistles 1907 {1}
McKay, Doug – Detroit Red Wings 1950 {1} – 1950 – Only NHL game played finals, qualified, still left off.
McKay, Randy – New Jersey Devils 1995-2000 {2}
McKendry, Alex – New York Islanders 1980 {1}
McKenna, Joe – Montreal Shamrocks 1899-1900 {2}
McKenney, Don – Toronto Maple Leafs 1964 {1}
McKenzie, Jim – New Jersey Devils 2003 {1}
McKenzie, John – Boston Bruins 1970-72 {2}
McLean, Jack - Toronto Maple Leafs 1945 {1}
McLellan, David – Montreal Victorias 1897 {1}
McMahon, Mike Sr. – Montreal Canadiens 1944 {1}
McManus, Sammy – Montreal Maroons 1935 {1}
McNab, Max – Detroit Red Wings 1950 {1}
McNamara, George  – Toronto Maple Leafs 1914 {1}
McNamara, Harold "Hal" – Montreal Canadiens 1916 {1}
McNamara, Howard – Montreal Canadiens 1916 {1}
McNeil, Gerry – Montreal Canadiens 1953-57-58 {3} – 1957 1958 – 9 NHL games played in 1957, none in 1958, included on cup as a spare goalie for playoffs.
McQuaid, Adam – Boston Bruins 2011 {1}
McQuestion, Harry – Detroit Red Wings 1950 – 1950 – never played in NHL, was spare goalie for the playoffs, so name was put on cup. NHL does not recognize him as a Stanley Cup winner.
McPhee, Mike – Montreal Canadiens 1986 {1}
McReavy, Pat – Boston Bruins 1939-41 {2} – 1939 – played only 3 regular season games, did not qualify, still included.
McRobie, Fred – Montreal Victorias 1899 {1}
McSorley, Marty – Edmonton Oilers 1987-88 {2}
Meech, Derek – Detroit Red Wings 2008 {1} – 2008 – played only 32 regular season games, included for spending the whole season with Detroit.
Meeker, Howie – Toronto Maple Leafs 1947-48-49-51{4}
Meeking, Harry – Toronto Arenas 1918; Victoria Cougars 1925 {2}
Meger, Paul – Montreal Canadiens 1953 {1}
Melanson, Roland – New York Islanders 1981-82-83 {3}
Melnyk, Larry – Edmonton Oilers 1984-85 {2} – 1984 – played 6 playoff games (4 in the Conference Finals), left off for not playing in the finals, spending the regular season in the minors.
Menard, Henri "Doc" – Montreal Wanderers 1906 {1}
Merrill, Horace – Ottawa Senators 1909-20-21 {3}
Merrick, Wayne – New York Islanders 1980-81-82-83 {4} 	
Merritt, George "Whitey" – Winnipeg Victorias 1896 {1}
Messier, Eric – Colorado Avalanche 2001 {1}
Messier, Mark "Moose" – Edmonton Oilers 1984-85-87-88-90; New York Rangers 1994 {6}
Messy, Harry – Montreal Victorias 1897 {1}
Metz, Don – Toronto Maple Leafs 1942–45-47-48-49 {5}
Metz, Nick – Toronto Maple Leafs 1942-45-47-48 {4}
Michayluk, Dave – Pittsburgh Penguins 1992 {1}
Mikita, Stan – Chicago Black Hawks 1961 {1}
Miller, Bill – Montreal Maroons 1935 {1}
Miller, Drew – Anaheim Ducks 2007 {1}
Miller, Earl – Toronto Maple Leafs 1932 {1}
Miller, Joe – New York Rangers 1928 {1}
Mironov, Dmitri – Detroit Red Wings 1998 {1}
Mitchell Ivan "Mike" – Toronto St. Pats 1922 {1} – 1922 – only played 1 regular season game due injuries. NHL recognizes Mitchell as Stanley Cup champion.
Mitchell, Willie – Los Angeles Kings 2012-14 {2}
Modano, Mike – Dallas Stars 1999 {1}
Modin, Fredrik – Tampa Bay Lightning 2004 {1}
Moen, Travis – Anaheim Ducks 2007 {1}
Mogilny, Alexander – New Jersey Devils 2000 {1}
Molson, Percy – Montreal Victorias 1897 {1}
Momesso, Sergio - Montreal Canadiens 1986 {1} – 1986 – only played 24 regular season games injured, left off cup, no injury exemption.
Mondou, Armand – Montreal Canadiens 1930-31 {2}
Mondou, Pierre – Montreal Canadiens 1977-78-79 {3}
Moog, Andy – Edmonton Oilers 1984-85-87 {3}
Moore, Alfie – Chicago Black Hawks 1938 {1}
Moore, Arthur – Ottawa Silver Sevens 1903-04-05-06 {4}
Moore, Dickie – Montreal Canadiens 1953-56-57-58-59-60 {6}
Moran, Patrick "Paddy" – Quebec Bulldogs 1912–13 {2}
Morenz, Howie – Montreal Canadiens 1924-30-31 {3}
Morris, Bernie – Seattle Metropolitans 1917 {1}
Morris, Elwyn "Moe" – Toronto Maple Leafs 1945 {1}
Morrow, Ken – New York Islanders 1980-81-82-83 {4}
Mortson, August "Gus" – Toronto Maple Leafs 1947-48-49-51 {4}
Mosdell, Ken – Montreal Canadiens 1946-53-56-59 {4}
Motter, Alex – Detroit Red Wings 1943 {1}
Motzko, Joe – Anaheim Ducks 2007 {1}
Mowers, Johnny – Detroit Red Wings 1943 {1}
Muir, Bryan – Colorado Avalanche 2001 {1} - played 8 regular season games, 3 playoff games, rest of season minors, did not qualify, name was included for playing in the conference finals
Mullen, Joe – Calgary Flames 1989; Pittsburgh Penguins 1991–92 {3}
Muller, Kirk – Montreal Canadiens 1993 {1}
Mummery, Harry – Quebec Bulldogs 1913; Toronto Arenas 1918 {2}
Muni, Craig – Edmonton Oilers 1987-88-90 {3}
 Munro, Duncan "Dunc" – Montreal Maroons 1926 {1}
Murdoch, Bob – Montreal Canadiens 1971-73 {2}
Murdoch, Murray – New York Rangers 1928-33 {2}
Murphy, Joe – Edmonton Oilers 1990 {1}
Murphy, Larry – Pittsburgh Penguins 1991-92; Detroit Red Wings 1997-98 {4}
Murphy Ron - Chicago Black Hawks 1961; Boston Bruins 1970 {2} – 1970 – only played 20 regular season games, retired before the playoffs, name still included on cup by Boston. - Engraved as Robert Murphy in 1961.
Murray, Matt – Pittsburgh Penguins 2016-17 {2}
Murray, Ryan - Colorado Avalanche 2022 {1} - 2022 - only played 37 regular season games, did not play in the playoffs. Included for missing 39 games injured & spending who season on the Colorado's Roster. 
Murray, Troy – Colorado Avalanche 1996 {1}
Murzyn, Dana – Calgary Flames 1989 {1}
Mussen, Auberdy  – Montreal AAA 1894 {1} 1894 – Dressed in the finals, but did not play.
Mussen, Clarence – Montreal AAA 1894 {1}
Muzzin, Jake - Los Angeles Kings 2014 {1}
Myre, Phil – Montreal Canadiens 1971 {1} – 1971 – played 30 regular season games, dressed for 70, qualified, left off for not dressing during the playoffs.

– N – 
Napier, Mark – Montreal Canadiens 1979; Edmonton Oilers 1985 {2}
Naslund, Mats – Montreal Canadiens 1986 {1}
Nattress, Rick – Calgary Flames 1989 {1}
Needham, Mike – Pittsburgh Penguins 1992 {1}
Neckar, Stanislav "Stan" – Tampa Bay Lightning 2004 {1} - 2004 - injured most of season with Nashville, included for playing 2 games Conference Finals.
Nemchinov, Sergei  – New York Rangers 1994; New Jersey Devils 2000 {2}
Nesterenko, Eric – Chicago Black Hawks 1961 {1}
Nevin, Bob – Toronto Maple Leafs 1962-63 {2}
Newhook, Alex – Colorado Avalanche 2022 {1}
Newman, Dan - Montreal Canadiens 1979 {1} - 16 regular season games played, 1 playoff game dressed, left off cup for not playing in the finals, spending most of the season in the minors.
Nicholson, Billy – Montreal AAA 1902-03 {2}
Nichushkin, Valeri – Colorado Avalanche 2022 {1}
Niedermayer, Rob Jr. – Anaheim Ducks 2007 {1}
Niedermayer, Scott – New Jersey Devils 1995-2000-03; Anaheim Ducks 2007 {4}
Niemi, Antti – Chicago Blackhawks 2010 {1}
Nieminen, Ville – Colorado Avalanche 2001 {1}
Niskanen, Matt - Washington Capitals 2018 {1}
Nieuwendyk, Joe – Calgary Flames 1989; Dallas Stars 1999; New Jersey Devils 2003 {3}
Nighbor, Frank – Vancouver Millionaires 1915; Ottawa Senators 1920-21-23-27 {5}
Nilan, Chris – Montreal Canadiens 1986 {1}
Nilsson, Kent – Edmonton Oilers 1987 {1}
Noble, Reg – Toronto Maple Leafs 1918–22; Montreal Maroons 1926 {3}
Nordstrom, Joakim - Chicago Blackhawks 2015 {1} - played 38 regular season games, and 3 playoff games, included for playing in the Conference Finals
Nolan, Jordan – Los Angeles Kings 2012-14 {2}
Nolan, Pat – Toronto Maple Leafs 1922 {1}
Nolet, Simon – Philadelphia Flyers 1974 {1}
Noonan, Brian – New York Rangers 1994 {1}
Northcott, Lawrence "Baldy" – Montreal Maroons 1935 {1}
Nystrom, Bob – New York Islanders 1980-81-82-83 {4}
Nyrop, Bill – Montreal Canadiens 1976-77-78 {3}

– O – 
Oatman, Eddie – Quebec Bulldogs 1912 {1}
O'Brien, Eddie – Montreal AAA 1894 {1}
O'Connor, Herbert "Buddy" – Montreal Canadiens 1944-46 {2}
O'Connor, Logan – Colorado Avalanche 2022 {1}
Odelein, Lyle – Montreal Canadiens 1993 {1}
O'Donnell, Sean – Anaheim Ducks 2007 {1}
Oduya, Johnny – Chicago Black Hawks 2013-15 {2}
Olausson, Fredrik – Detroit Red Wings 2002 {1}
Olczyk, Ed – New York Rangers 1994 {1} - played 37 regular season games, & 1 game in conference finals, injured, name was added to cup for spending the whole season with the Rangers.
Oliver, Harold "Pee Wee" – Boston Bruins 1929 {1}
Oliwa, Krzysztof – New Jersey Devils 2000 {1}
Olmstead, Bert – Montreal Canadiens 1953-56-57-58; Toronto Maple Leafs 1962 {5}
O’Neill, Tom "Windy"  – Toronto Maple Leafs 1945 {1}
O'Reilly, Ryan – St. Louis Blues 2019 {1}
Orlov, Dmitry - Washington Capitals 2018 {1}
Orr, Bobby – Boston Bruins 1970–72 {2}
Orlando, Jimmy – Detroit Red Wings 1937-43 {2} – 1937 – played 9 regular season games, did not qualify, still included.
Orpik, Brooks – Pittsburgh Penguins 2009; Washington Capitals 2018 {2}
Osgood, Chris "Osie" – Detroit Red Wings 1997-98-08 {3}
Oshie, Timothy Leif "T.J." - Washington Capitals 2018 {1}
Otto, Joel – Calgary Flames 1989 {1}
Ovechkin, Alexander "Alex, Ovie." - Washington Capitals 2018 {1}
Owen, George – Boston Bruins 1929 {1}
Ozolinsh, Sandis – Colorado Avalanche 1996 {1}

– P – 
Paek, Jim – Pittsburgh Penguins 1991-92 {2}
Pahlsson, Samuel – Anaheim Ducks 2007 {1}
Paille, Daniel – Boston Bruins 2011 {1}
Palangio, Pete – Chicago Black Hawks 1938 {1} - 1938 - engraved twice once Palago & once as Pete Palangio
Palat, Ondrej - Tampa Bay Lightning 2020-21 {2}
Pandolfo, Jay – New Jersey Devils 2000-03 {2}
Pappin, Jim – Toronto Maple Leafs 1964-67 {2}
Paquette, Cedric - Tampa Bay Lightning 2020 {1}
Parayko, Colton – St. Louis Blues 2019 {1}
Parent, Bernie – Philadelphia Flyers 1974-75 {2}
Parker, Scott – Colorado Avalanche 2001 {1}
Parros, George – Anaheim Ducks 2007 {1}
Parse, Scott - Los Angeles Kings 2012 - 2012 - Only played 5 regular season games 2011, 9 regular season games 2012 injured. Name was left off, no injury exemption.
Paton, Tom – Montreal AAA 1893 {1}
Patrick, Frank - Vancouver Millionaires 1915 {1} – 1915 – playing Manager-Coach.
Patrick, Lester "Silver Fox" – Montreal Wanderers 1906-07; New York Rangers 1928 {3} – 1928 – playing Manager-Coach.
Patrick, Lynn – New York Rangers 1940 {1}
Patrick, Murray "Muzzy" – New York Rangers 1940 {1}
Patterson, Colin – Calgary Flames 1989 {1}
Pavelich, Marty – Detroit Red Wings 1950-52-54-55 {4}
Pearson, Tanner - Los Angeles Kings 2014 {1}
Pederson, Barry – Pittsburgh Penguins 1991 {1}
Peluso, Mike – New Jersey Devils 1995 {1}
Penner, Dustin – Anaheim Ducks 2007; Los Angeles Kings 2012 {2}
Penney, Steve – Montreal Canadiens 1986 {1} – 1986 – played 18 regular season games, dressed for 30 games, injured, left off, no injury exemption
Peplinski, Jim – Calgary Flames 1989 {1}
Perrin, Eric – Tampa Bay Lightning 2004 {1} – 2004 - played 4 regular season games, 12 playoff games, included for playing 4 games conference finals.
Perron, David – St. Louis Blues 2019 {1}
Perry, Corey – Anaheim Ducks 2007 {1}
Persson, Stefan – New York Islanders 1980-81-82-83 {4}
Peters, Garry  – Montreal Canadiens 1965; Boston Bruins 1972 {2} – 1965 – played 13 regular season games, did not qualify, still on cup.  – 1972 – played 2 regular season games, and 1 game semi-finals, qualified name left off
Peters, Jimmy Sr. – Montreal Canadiens 1946; Detroit Red Wings 1950-54 {3}
Petrov, Oleg – Montreal Canadiens 1993 {1} 1993 – played 9 regular season & 1 playoff game, left off for not playing in the finals, spending most of season in the minors.
Pettinger, Eric – Boston Bruins 1929 {1} – 1929 – a member of Toronto Maple Leafs when Boston won the Stanley Cup, but name was added in 1958.  NHL does not recognize Eric Pettinger as a Stanley Cup winner.
Pettinger, Gord – New York Rangers 1933; Detroit Red Wings 1936-37; Boston Bruins 1939 {4}
Peverley, Rich – Boston Bruins 2011 {1}
Phillips, Bill – Montreal Maroons 1926 {1}
Phillips, Russell – Kenora Thistles 1907 {1}
Phillips, Tommy – Montreal AAA 1903; Kenora Thistles 1907 {2}
Picard, Noel – Montreal Canadiens 1965 {1}
Pietrangelo, Alex – St. Louis Blues 2019 {1}
Pietrangelo, Frank – Pittsburgh Penguins 1991 {1}
Pike, Alf – New York Rangers 1940 {1}
Pilote, Pierre – Chicago Black Hawks 1961 {1}
Pitre, Didier "Cannonball" – Montreal Canadiens 1916 {1}	
Plamondon, Gerry – Montreal Canadiens 1946 {1}
Plante, Derek – Dallas Stars 1999 {1} 	
Plante, Jacques – Montreal Canadiens 1953-56-57-58-59-60 {6}
Plasse, Michel – Montreal Canadiens 1973 {1}
Podein, Shjon – Colorado Avalanche 2001 {1}
Poile, Norman "Bud" -Toronto Maple Leafs 1947 {1}
Point, Brayden - Tampa Bay Lightning 2020-21 {2}
Pouliot, Derrick - Pittsburgh Penguins 2016 {1} - 2016 - played 22 regular season, 2 playoffs games, left off for not playing in the finals, playing most of season in the minors.
Polich, Mike – Montreal Canadiens 1977 {1}
Porter, Kevin – Pittsburgh Penguins 2016 {1}
Portland, Jack – Boston Bruins 1939 {1}
Potvin, Denis – New York Islanders 1980-81-82-83 {4}
Potvin, Jean – New York Islanders 1980-81 {2} – 1980 – played 32 regular season games, 1981 – played 18 regular season games, did not qualify, but name was included for spending whole season with the Islanders.
Poulin, George "Skinner" – Montreal Canadiens 1916 {1}
Pouzar, Jaroslav – Edmonton Oilers 1984-85-87 {3}
Power, James "Rocket"  – Quebec Bulldogs 1913 {1}
Pratt, Nolan – Colorado Avalanche 2001; Tampa Bay Lightning 2004 {2}
Pratt, Water "Babe" – New York Rangers 1940; Toronto Maple Leafs 1945 {2}
Price, Noel – Montreal Canadiens 1966 {1}
Priestlay, Ken – Pittsburgh Penguins 1992 {1}
Primeau, Joe – Toronto Maple Leafs 1932 {1}
Prodgers, George "Goldie" – Quebec Bulldogs 1912; Montreal Canadiens 1916 {2}
Pronger, Chris – Anaheim Ducks 2007 {1}
Pronovost, Andre – Montreal Canadiens 1957-58-59-60 {4}
Pronovost, Marcel – Detroit Red Wings 1950-52-54-55; Toronto Maple Leafs 1967 {5}
Provost, Claude – Montreal Canadiens 1956-57-58-59-60-65-66-68-69 {9}
Pryakhin, Sergei – Calgary Flames 1989 {1} – 1989 – played 2 regular season games, 1 playoff game. Left off for not playing in the finals, spending most of season in Europe.
Prystai, Metro – Detroit Red Wings 1952-54 {2}
Pulford, Harvey – Ottawa Silver Sevens 1903-04-05-06 {4}
Pulford, Bob – Toronto 1962-63-64-67 {4}
Pullan, William – Montreal Victorias 1895 {1}
Pushor, Jamie – Detroit Red Wings 1997 {1}
Pusie, Jean – Montreal Canadiens 1931 {1} –  1931 – played 6 regular season games, 3 games in finals, qualified, but left off.

– Q – 
Quick, Jonathan  – Los Angeles Kings 2012-14 {2}

– R –
 Raanta, Antti - Chicago Blackhawks 2015 {1} - 2015 - played 14 regular season games, dressed for 51 games. Left for playing in minors after the trading deadline, and not dressing in the playoffs.
Raciot, Andre – Montreal Canadiens 1993 {1}
Racine Bruce – Pittsburgh Penguins 1991 {1} – 1991 – dressed for 4 playoff games, but never played for Pittsburgh. Left off cup for not dressing in finals.
Rafalski, Brian – New Jersey Devils 2000–03; Detroit Red Wings 2008 {3}
Ramage, Rob – Calgary Flames 1989; Montreal Canadiens 1993 {2}
Randall, Ken – Toronto Arenas 1918; Toronto St. Pats 1922 {2}
Ranford, Bill – Edmonton Oilers 1988-90 {2}
Rankin, Norm – Montreal Victorias 1895 {1}
Rantanen, Mikko – Colorado Avalanche 2022 {1}
Rask, Tuukka – Boston Bruins 2011 {1}
Reardon, Ken - Montreal Canadiens 1946 {1}
Reardon, Terry – Boston Bruins 1939-41 {2} – 1939 – 4 regular season games played, did not qualify, still included.
Reaugh, Daryl  – Edmonton Oilers 1988 {1} – 1988 – 6 game played regular season games, dressed for 60 games, left off for playing in the minors during the playoffs.
Reay, Billy – Montreal Canadiens 1946-53 {2}
Recchi, Mark – Pittsburgh Penguins 1991; Carolina Hurricanes 2006; Boston Bruins 2011 {3}
Reddick, Eldon "Pokey" – Edmonton Oilers 1990 {1}
Redmond, Michael "Mickey" – Montreal Canadiens 1968–69 {2}
Regehr, Robyn – Los Angeles Kings 2014 {1}
Reibel, Earl "Dutch"  –  Detroit Red Wings 1954-55 {2}
Reid, Dave – Dallas Stars 1999; Colorado Avalanche 2001 {2}
Reinprecht, Steven – Colorado Avalanche 2001 {1}
Resch, Glenn "Chico" – New York Islanders 1980 {1}
Reise, Leo Jr. – Detroit Red Wings 1950-52 {2}
Rheaume, Pascal – New Jersey Devils 2003 {1}
Ricci, Mike – Colorado Avalanche 1996 {1}
Richard, Henri "Pocket Rocket" – Montreal Canadiens 1956-57-58-59-60-65-66-68-69-71-73 {11}
Richard, Maurice "Rocket" – Montreal Canadiens 1944-46-53-56-57-58-59-60 {8}
Richards, Brad – Tampa Bay Lightning 2004; Chicago Blackhawks 2015 {2}
Richards, Mike – Los Angeles Kings 2012-14 {2}
Richardson, Brad – Los Angeles Kings 2012 {1}
Richardson, Frank – Montreal Victorias 1898–99 {2} – playing Coach
Richer, Stephane – Montreal Canadiens 1986; New Jersey Devils 1995 {2}
Rickey, Roy – Seattle Metropolitans 1917 {1}
Richter, Mike – New York Rangers 1994 {1}
Ridpath, Bruce – Ottawa Senators 1910-11 {2}
Riley, Jim – Seattle Metropolitans 1917 {1}
Risebrough, Doug – Montreal Canadiens 1976-77-78-79 {4}
Rivers, August "Gus" – Montreal Canadiens 1930-31 {2}
Roach, John Ross – Toronto St. Pats 1922 {1}
Roberge, Mario – Montreal Cadiens 1993 {1}
Roberto, Phillip – Montreal Canadiens 1971 {1}
Roberts, Gary – Calgary Flames 1989 {1}
Roberts, Gordie – Pittsburgh Penguins 1991-92 {2}
Roberts, Gordon "Doc" – Ottawa Senators 1910 {1}
Roberts, Jim – Montreal Canadiens 1965-66-73-76-77 {5}
Robertson, Earl – Detroit Red Wings 1937 {1}
Robertson, Fred – Toronto Maple Leafs 1932 {1}
Robinson, Earl – Montreal Maroons 1935 {1}
Robinson, Larry "Big Bird" – Montreal Canadiens 1973-76-77-78-79-86 {6}
Robitaille, Luc – Detroit Red Wings 2002 {1}
Rochefort, Leon – Montreal Canadiens 1966-71 {2}
Rodden, Eddie – Boston Bruins 1929 {1}
Rollins, Elwin "Al" – Toronto Maple Leafs 1951 {1}
Rolston, Brian – New Jersey Devils 1995 {1}
Rome, Aaron – Anaheim Ducks 2007 {1} – 2007 – played 1 regular season,1 playoff game, but left off not playing in the finals, spending most of the season in the minors
Romnes, Elwyn "Doc" – Chicago Black Hawks 1934-38 {2}
Ronan, Ed – Montreal Canadiens 1993 {1}
Ronan, Erskene "Skene" – Montreal Canadiens 1916 {1}
Rooney, Steve – Montreal Canadiens 1986 {1}
Rooney, Walter –  Quebec Bulldogs 1912-13 {2} - 1913 - spare did not play, but dressed in the finals
Ross, Art – Kenora 1907; Montreal Wanderers 1908 {2}
Rothschild, Sammy – Montreal Maroons 1926 {1}
Roulston, Orville "Rolly" – Detroit Red Wings 1937 {1} – 1937 – only played 21 regular season games injured, so name was included. 
Rouse, Bob - Detroit Red Wings 1997–98 {2}
Routh, Haviland  – Montreal AAA 1893–94 {2}
Rowe, Bobby – Seattle Metropolitans 1917 {1}
Rowney, Carter – Pittsburgh Penguins 2017 {1}
Roy, Andre – Tampa Bay Lightning 2004 {1}
Roy, Patrick – Montreal Canadiens 1986-93; Colorado Avalanche 1996-2001 {4} 
Rozsival, Michal – Chicago Blackhawks 2013-15 {2}
Ruhwedel, Chad - Pittsburgh 2017 – 2017 - played 34 regular season games, 11 games in the playoffs (4 conference games Finals), missed finals injured. left off cup for spending 1/3 of season in the minors.
Rouotsalainen, Reijo – Edmonton Oilers 1987-90 {2}
Rousseau, Bobby – Montreal Canadiens 1965-66-68-69 {4}
Rumble, Darren – Tampa Bay Lightning 2004 {1} – 2004 – played 5 regular season games, included for spending the whole season with Tampa Bay.
Rundblad, David - Chicago Blackhawks 2015 {1}
Rupp Mike – New Jersey Devils 2003 {1}
Russell, Ernie – Montreal Wanderers 1906-07-08-10
Rust, Bryan – Pittsburgh Penguins 2016-17 {2}
Rutta, Jan - Tampa Bay Lightning 2020-21 {2}
Rychel, Warren – Colorado Avalanche 1996 {1}
Ryder, Michael – Boston Bruins 2011 {1}

– S – 
Saad, Brandon – Chicago Blackhawks 2013-15 {2}
Sabourin, Ken – Calgary Flames 1989 {1} – 1989 – played 9 regular season, 1 playoff games. Left off for not playing in the finals, spending most of the season in the minors.
Sakic, Joe – Colorado Avalanche 1996-2001 {2}
Saleski, Don – Philadelphia Flyers 1974-75 {2}
Samis, Phil – Toronto Maple Leafs 1948 {1}
Samuelsson, Mikael – Detroit Red wings 2008 {1}
Samuelsson, Ulf – Pittsburgh Penguins 1991-92 {2}
Samuelsson, Kjell – Pittsburgh Penguins 1992 {1}
Sands, Charlie – Boston Bruins 1939 {1}
Sanderson, Derek – Boston Bruins 1970-72 {2}
Sandstrom, Tomas – Detroit Red Wings 1997 {1}
Sanford, Zachary – St. Louis Blues 2019 {1}
Sarich, Cory – Tampa Bay Lightning 2004 {1}
Satan, Miroslav – Pittsburgh Penguins 2009 {1}
Savard, David –Tampa Bay Lightning 2021 {1}
Savard, Denis – Montreal Canadiens 1993 {1}
Savard, Marc – Boston Bruins 2011 {1} – 2011 – only played 25 regular season games injured, so name was included.
Savard, Joe – Quebec Bulldogs 1912–13 {1}  – 1913 – spare goalie, but did not play.
Savard, Serge – Montreal Canadiens 1968-69-71-73-76-77-78-79 {8} – 1971 - only played 37 regular season games, injured, left off cup for not playing in the playoffs.
Sawchuk, Terry – Detroit Red Wings 1952-54-55; Toronto Maple Leafs 1967 {4}
Scanlon, Fred – Montreal Shamrocks 1899-1900; Winnipeg Victorias 1902 {3}
Schenn, Brayden – St. Louis Blues 2019 {1}
Schenn, Luke - Tampa Bay Lightning 2020-21 {2}
Schlizzi, Enio – Detroit Red Wings 1952 {1} – 1952 – played 9 regular season games, did not qualify, still included.
Schmidt, Milt – Boston Bruins 1939-41 {2}
Schneider, Matthieu – Montreal Canadiens 1993 {1}
Schriner, Dave – Toronto Maple Leafs 1942-45 {2}
Schock, Danny – Boston Bruins 1970 {1} – 1970
Schultz, Jeff – Los Angeles Kings 2014 {1} - 2014 - spent regular season playing in the minors. played 7 playoff games, included for playing 1 conference final game.
Schultz, Dave – Philadelphia Flyers 1974-75 {2}
Schultz, Justin – Pittsburgh Penguins 2016-17 {2}
Schwab, Corey – New Jersey Devils 2003 {1}
Schwartz, Jaden – St. Louis Blues 2019 {1}
Scott – Ottawa Silver Sevens 1904 {1} - First name unknown
Scott, Laurie – New York Rangers 1928 {1} – 1928 – played 1/2 the regular season games, qualified to be on cup, left off for playing in minors during the playoffs.
Scuderi, Rob – Pittsburgh Penguins 2009; Los Angeles Kings 2012 {2}
Seabrook, Brent – Chicago Blackhawks 2010-13-15 {3}
Seaborn, Jim – Vancouver Millionaires 1915 {1}
Seguin, Tyler – Boston Bruins 2011 {1}
Seibert, Earl – New York Rangers 1933; Chicago Black Hawks 1938 {2}
Seidenberg, Dennis – Boston Bruins 2011 {1}
Selanne, Teemu – Anaheim Ducks 2007 {1}
Semenko, Dave – Edmonton Oilers 1984-85 {2}
Semenov, Anatoli – Edmonton Oilers 1990 {1} – 1990 – played 2 games Conference Finals, left off for not playing in the finals, spending most of season playing in Europe
Sergachev, Mikhail - Tampa Bay Lightning 2020-21 {2}
Severyn, Brent – Dallas Stars 1999 {1} – 1999 – only played 32 regular season games injured, so name was included.
Sevigny, Richard – Montreal Canadiens 1979 {1} – 1979 – name was engraved on cup for dressing in the finals, but had not played in the NHL.
Shack, Eddie - Toronto Maple leafs 1962-63-64-67 {4}
Shanahan, Brendan – Detroit Red Wings 1997-98-2002 {3}
Shannon, Ryan – Anaheim Ducks 2007 {1}
Sharp, Patrick – Chicago Blackhawks 2010-13-15 {3}
Shattenkirk, Kevin - Tampa Bay Lightning 2020 {1}
Shaw, Andrew – Chicago Blackhawks 2013-15 {2}
Sheary, Conor – Pittsburgh Penguins 2016-17 {2}
Sheehan, Bobby – Montreal Canadiens 1971 {1}
Sheppard, Jack - Winnipeg Victorias - 1896 - played 1 regular season game, missing from team picture
Sheppard, John – Chicago Black Hawks 1934 {1}
Sherf, John – Detroit Red Wings 1937 {1}
Shewchuk, Jack – Boston Bruins 1939-41 {2} – 1939 – played 3 regular season games, did not qualify, still included.
Shibicky, Alex  – New York Rangers 1940 {1}
Shields, Al – Montreal Maroons 1935 {1}
Shill, John – Chicago Black Hawks 1938 {1}
Shore, Eddie – Boston Bruins 1929-39 {2}
Shore, Hamilton "Hamby" – Ottawa Silver Sevens 1905-Ottawa Senators 1910-11 {3}
Shutt, Steve – Montreal Canadiens 1973-76-77-78-79 {5}
Siebert, Babe – Montreal Maroons 1926; New York Rangers 1933 {2}
Sim, Jon – Dallas Stars 1999 {1}
Simmons, Don – Toronto Maple Leafs 1962-63-64 {3}
Simon, Chris – Colorado Avalanche 1996 {1}
Simon John "Cully" – Detroit Red Wings 1943 {1}
Simpson, Craig – Edmonton Oilers 1988-90 {2}
Sims, Percy  – Ottawa Silver Sevens 1903 {1}
Skinner, Alf "Dutch" –	Toronto Arenas 1918 {1}
Skoula, Martin – Colorado Avalanche 2001 {1}
Skov, Glen – Detroit Red Wings 1952-54-55 {3}
Skrudland, Brian – Montreal Canadiens 1986; Dallas Stars 1999 {2}
Slegr, Jiri – Detroit Red Wings 2002 {1}
Sloan, Blake – Dallas Stars 1999 {1}
Sloan, Tod - Toronto Maple Leafs 1951; Chicago 1961 {2} - engraved in 1961 as Martin A. Sloan
Smaill, Walter – Montreal Wanderers 1908; Ottawa Senators 1910 {2}
Smehlik, Richard – New Jersey Devils 2003 {1}
Smith, Al – Toronto Maple Leafs 1967 {1} – 1967 – played 1 regular season game, dressed 2 games finals, qualified, but name was left off for not playing in playoffs.
Smith, Alex Ottawa Senators 1927 {1}
Smith, Alf – Ottawa Silver Sevens 1904-05-06; Kenora 1907 {4} - playing-coach in 1904-05-06 (Won cup with Ottawa 1903 as Coach, but did not play)
Smith, Ben – Chicago Blackhawks 2013 {1} 
Smith, Billy – New York Islanders 1980-81-82-83 {4}
Smith, Bobby – Montreal Canadiens 1986 {1}
Smith, Clint – New York Rangers 1940 {1}
Smith, Dallas – Boston Bruins 1970-72 {2}
Smith, Des – Boston Bruins 1941 {1}
Smith, Geoff – Edmonton Oilers 1990 {1}
Smith, Grathton "Glenn" – Toronto St. Pats 1922 {1}
Smith, George – Montreal AAA 1902–03 {2} – 1902 – dressed in the finals, did not play.
Smith, Harry – Ottawa Silver Sevens 1906; Montreal Wanderers 1908 {2}
Smith, James Steve  – Edmonton Oilers 1987-88-90 {3}
Smith, Normie – Detroit Red Wings 1936-37 {2}
Smith, Reginald “Hooley” – Ottawa Senators 1927; Montreal Maroons 1935 {2}
Smith, Rick – Boston Bruins 1970 {1}
Smith, Stanford "Stan" – New York Rangers 1940 {1} – 1940 – played 1 games finals, qualified, but name left off.
Smith, Sid – Toronto Maple Leafs 1948-49-51 {3}
Smith, Tommy – Ottawa Silver Sevens 1906; Quebec Bulldogs 1913 {2}
Smith-Pelly, Devante - Washington Capitals 2018 {1}
Smylie, Rod – Toronto St. pats 1922 {1}
Soetaert, Doug – Montreal Canadiens 1986 {1}
Somers, Art – New York Rangers 1933 {1}
Sopel, Brent – Chicago Blackhawks 2010 {1}
Sorrell, Johnny – Detroit Red Wings 1936-37 {2}
Speer, Bill – Boston Bruins 1970 {1}
Spittal, Charles – Ottawa Silver Sevens 1903 {1}
Stackhouse, Ted – Toronto St. Pats 1922 {1}
Staal, Eric – Carolina Hurricanes 2006 {1}
Staal, Jordan – Pittsburgh Penguins 2009 {1}
Stalberg, Viktor – Chicago Blackhawks 2013 {1}
Stamkos, Steven - Tampa Bay Lightning 2020-21 {2}
Stanfield, Fred – Boston Bruins 1970-72 {2}
Stanley, Allan – Toronto Maple Leafs 1962-63-64-67 {4}
Stanley, Barney "Russell" – Vancouver Millionaires 1915 {1}
Stanowski, Wally – Toronto Maple Leafs 1942-45-47-48 {4}
Stanton, Paul – Pittsburgh Penguins 1991-92 {2}
Starke, Joe  – Chicago Black Hawks 1934 {1} – 1934 – never played in NHL, included as spare goalie for the playoffs. NHL does not recognize him as a Stanley Cup winner.
Stasiuk, Vic – Detroit Red Wings 1952-54-55 {3} – 1954 – played 42 regular season games, qualified, left off for playing in the minors during the playoffs.
Steen, Alexander – St. Louis Blues 2019 {1}
Stemkowski, Peter – Toronto Maple Leafs 1967 {1}
Stephens, Mitchell - Tampa Bay Lightning 2020 {1}
Stephenson, Chandler - Washington Capitals 2018 {1}
Stephenson, Wayne – Philadelphia Flyers 1975 {1}
Stevens, Kevin – Pittsburgh Penguins 1991-92 {2}
Stevens, Scott – New Jersey Devils 1995-2000-03 {3}
Stevenson, Turner – New Jersey Devils 2003 {1}
Stewart, Gaye – Toronto Maple Leafs 1942-47 {2}
Stewart, James – Montreal AAA 1893–94 {2} – playing President
Stewart, John – Detroit Red Wings 1943-50 {2}
Stewart, Nels "Old Poison" – Montreal Maroons 1926 {1}
Stewart, Ron – Toronto Maple Leafs 1962-63-64 {3}
Stillman, Corey – Tampa Bay Lightning 2004; Carolina Hurricanes 2006 {2}
Stoll, Jarret – Los Angeles Kings 2012-14 {2}
Streit, Mark – Pittsburgh Penguins 2017 {1}
St. Laurent, Dollard – Montreal Canadiens 1953-56-57-58; Chicago Black Hawks 1961 {5}
St. Louis, Martin – Tampa Bay Lightning 2004 {1}
Strachan, Billy – Montreal Wanderers 1906-07 {2}
Stuart, Brad – Detroit Red Wings 2008 {1}
Stuart Bruce – Montreal Wanderers 1908; Ottawa Senators 1909-10-11 {4}
Stuart, Hodgenson "Hod" – Montreal Wanderers 1906-07 {2}
Stuart, Bill "Red" – Toronto St. Pats 1922 {1}
Sturm, Nico – Colorado Avalanche 2022 {1}
Sundqvist, Oskar - Pittsburgh Penguins 2016; St. Louis Blues 2019 {2} - 2016 - played 18 regular season, 2 playoff games. left off for not playing in finals, spending most of the season in the minors.
Summanen, Raimo – Edmonton Oilers 1984 {1} – 1984 – played 2 regular season games & 5 playoff games. Left off for not playing in the finals, spending most of the season in Europe.
Suter, Gary – Calgary Flames 1989 {1}
Sutter, Brent – New York Islanders 1982-83 {2}
Sutter, Duane – New York  Islanders 1980-81-82-83 {4}
Sutton, Ken – New Jersey Devils 2000 {1} – 2000 – played only 6 regular season games, spent most of season in minors did not qualify, still included.
Svoboda, Petr – Montreal Canadiens 1986 {1}
Sydor, Darryl – Dallas Stars 1999; Tampa Bay Lightning 2004 {2}
Sykora, Petr – New Jersey Devils 2000; Pittsburgh Penguins 2009 {2}

– T –
Taglianetti, Peter – Pittsburgh Penguins 1991–92 {2}
Talbot, Jean-Guy – Montreal Canadiens 1956-57-58-59-60-65-66 {7}
Talbot, Maxime – Pittsburgh Penguins 2009 {1}
Tambellini, Steven – New York Islanders 1980 {1}
Tanguay, Alex – Colorado Avalanche 2001 {1}
Tansey, Frank – Montreal Shamrocks 1899–1900 {2}
Tarasenko, Vladimir – St. Louis Blues 2019 {1}
Tardif, Marc – Montreal Canadiens 1971-73 {2}
Taylor, Fred "Cyclone" – Ottawa Senators 1909; Vancouver Millionaires 1915 {2}	
Taylor, Harry – Toronto Maple Leafs 1949 {1}
Taylor, Tim – Detroit Red Wings 1997; Tampa Bay Lightning 2004 {2}
Taylor, Bob – Philadelphia Flyers 1974-75 {2}
Taylor Billy Sr. Toronto Maple Leafs 1942 {1}
 Teale, W. Toronto St. Pats 1922 {1} – 1922 – spare goalie for the playoffs, never played in the NHL, but is on the team picture. NHL does not recognize him as a Stanley Cup winner. First Name unknown
Terreri, Chris – New Jersey Devils 1995-2000 {2}
Teräväinen, Teuvo - Chicago Blackhawks 2015 {1}
Thomas, Robert – St. Louis Blues 2019 {1}
Thomas, Tim – Boston Bruins 2011 {1}
Thompson, Cecil "Tiny" – Boston Bruins 1929 {1}
Thomson, Jim – Toronto Maple Leafs 1947-48-49-51 {4}
Thompson, Paul – New York Rangers 1928; Chicago Black Hawks 1934-38 {3}
Thornton, Shawn – Anaheim Ducks 2007; Boston Bruins 2011 {2}
Tibbs, Bill – Detroit Red Wings 1952 {1} – 1952 – never played in the NHL, spare goalie for Detroit for the playoffs. NHL does not recognize him as a Stanley Cup winner. 
Tikkanen, Esa – Edmonton Oilers 1985-87-88-90; New York Rangers 1994 {5}
Timgren, Ray  – Toronto Maple Leafs 1949-51 {2}
Timonen, Kimmo - Chicago Blackhawks 2015 {1}
Tocchet, Rick – Pittsburgh Penguins 1992 {1}
Toews, Devon – Colorado Avalanche 2022 {1}
Toews, Jonathan – Chicago Blackhawks 2010-13-15 {3}
Toffoli, Tyler - Los Angeles Kings 2014 {1}
Tonelli, John -New York Islanders 1980-81-82-83 {4}
Tremblay, Jean-Claude "J.C." – Montreal Canadiens 1965-66-68-69-71 {5}
Tremblay, Gilles – Montreal Canadiens 1965-66-68-69 {4} – 1965 – only played 25 games injured, so name was included, – 1969 – only played 44 games injured, so name was included.
Tremblay, Mario – Montreal Canadiens 1976-77-78-79-86 {5}
Trihey, Harry – Montreal Shamrocks 1899-1900 {2}
Trottier, Bryan - New York Islanders 1980-81-82-83; Pittsburgh Penguins 1991–92 {6}
Trottier, Dave – Montreal Maroons 1935 {1}
Trudel, Lou – Chicago Black Hawks 1934-38 {2}
Turek, Roman – Dallas Stars 1999 {1}
Turner, Bob – Montreal Canadiens 1956-57-58-59-60 {5}
Tverdovsky, Oleg – New Jersey Devils 2003; Carolina Hurricanes 2006 {2}

– V – 
Vachon, Rogie – Montreal Canadiens 1968-69-71 {3}
Vadnais, Carol – Montreal Canadiens 1968; Boston Bruins 1972 {2}
Van Boxmeer, John	– Montreal Canadiens 1976 – 1976 – played 46 regular season games, qualified, but did not dress in the playoffs, so name was left off.
Van Impe, Ed – Philadelphia Flyers 1974-75 {2}
Van Riemsdyk, Trevor - Chicago Blackhawks 2015 {1}
Van Dorp, Wayne – Edmonton Oilers 1987 {1} – 1987 – played 3 regular season games, 3 Conference Finals games. Left off for not playing in finals, spending most of the season in the minors
Vasicek, Josef – Carolina Hurricanes 2006 {1}
Vasko, Elmer "Moose" – Chicago Black Hawks 1961 {1}
Vasilevskiy, Andrei - Tampa Bay Lightning 2020-21 {2}
Verbeek, Pat – Dallas Stars 1999 {1}
Verhaeghe, Carter - Tampa Bay Lightning 2020 {1}
Vermette, Antoine - Chicago Blackhawks 2015 {1}
Vernon, Mike – Calgary Flames 1989; Detroit Red Wings 1997 {2}
Versteeg, Kris – Chicago Blackhawks 2010-15 {2}	
Veznia, Georges – Montreal Canadiens 1916-24 {2}
Volkov, Alexander - Tampa Bay Lightning 2020 {1}
Voss, Carl – Chicago Black Hawks 1938 {1}
Voynov, Slava – Los Angeles Kings 2012-14 {2}
Vrána, Jakub - Washington Capitals 2018 {1}

– W – 
 Wakely, Ernie – Montreal Canadiens 1965-68 {2} – 1965–68 – Spare goalie for the playoff, did not play for Montreal. May have dressed for one or more playoff games, so name was put on cup.
 Walker Jack – Toronto Blueshirts 1914; Seattle Metropolitans 1917; Victoria Cougars 1925 {3}
 Walker, Nathan - Washington Capitals 2018 {1} - 2 games for Edmonton, 7 regular season & 1 playoff games for Washington, left off for not playing in the finals, spending most of the season in the minors.  
 Wall, Frank – Montreal Shamrocks 1899-1900 {2}
 Wallance, William "Reg" – Montreal Victorias 1896 {1}
 Wallin, Jesse - Detroit 2002 {1} - 2002 - only played 15 regular season games injured. No Injury exemption.
 Wallin, Niclas – Carolina Hurricanes 2006 {1}
 Walsh, Marty – Ottawa Senators 1909-10-11 {3}
 Walter, Ryan – Montreal Canadiens 1986 {1}
 Walton, Mike – Toronto Maple Leafs 1967; Boston Bruins 1972 {2}
 Wamsley, Rick – Calgary Flames 1989 {1}
 Waud, Arthur "Toat" – Montreal AAA 1893-94 {2}
 Ward, Aaron – Detroit Red Wings 1997-98; Carolina Hurricanes 2006 {3}
 Ward, Cam – Carolina Hurricanes 2006 {1}
 Ward, Jimmy – Montreal Maroons 1935 {1}
 Wares, Eddie – Detroit Red Wings 1943 {1}
 Wasnie, Nick – Montreal Canadiens 1930-31 {2}
 Watson, Bryan – Montreal Canadiens 1965 {1} – 1965 – only 8 regular season games played, did not qualify but name was included.
 Watson, Harry "Whipper" – Detroit Red Wings 1943; Toronto Maple Leafs 1947-48-49-51 {5}
 Watson, Jim – Philadelphia Flyers 1974-75 {2}
 Watson, Joe – Philadelphia Flyers 1974-75 {2}
 Watson, Phil – NY Rangers 1940; Montreal Canadiens 1944 {2}
 Weiland, Ralph "Cooney" – Boston Bruins 1929-39 {2}
 Weight, Doug – Carolina Hurricanes 2006 {1}
 Wells, Jay – New York Rangers 1994 {1}
 Wentworth, Marvin "Cy" – Montreal Maroons 1935 {1}
 Wesley, Glen – Carolina Hurricanes 2006 {1}
 Westfall, Ed – Boston Bruins 1970-72 {2}
 Westgarth, Kevin – Los Angeles Kings 2012 {1} – 2012 – played 25 regular season games injured, so name was included.
 Westwick, Harry "Rat" – Ottawa Silver Sevens 1903-04-05-06; Kenora Thistles 1907{5}
 Wharram, Ken – Chicago Black Hawks 1961 {1}
 Wiemer, Jim – Edmonton Oilers 1988 {1} – 1988 – played 12 regular season, 2 games in the Conference Finals. Left off for not playing in the finals, spending most of season in the minors
 Whitcroft, Fred – Kenora Thistles 1907 {1}
 White, Colin – New Jersey Devils 2000–03 {2}
  White, Frank – Ottawa Silver Sevens 1905 {1}
 Whitney, Ray – Carolina Hurricanes 2006 {1}
 Wiebe, Art – Chicago Black Hawks 1938 {1}
 Williams, Jason – Detroit Red Wings 2002 {1}
 Williams, Justin – Carolina Hurricanes 2006; Los Angeles Kings 2012-14 {3}
  Willett, Stanley – Montreal Victorias 1896 {1}
 Wilson, Carol "Cully" – Toronto Blueshirts 1914; Seattle Metropolitans 1917 {2}
 Wilson, Claude – Toronto Blueshirts 1914 {1}
 Wilson, Johnny – Detroit Red Wings 1950-52-54-55 {4}
 Wilson, Larry – Detroit Red Wings 1950 {1}
 Wilson, Murray – Montreal Canadiens 1973-76-77-78 {4} – 1978 – Only played 12 regular season games injured, so name was included.
 Wilson, Ross "Lefty" – Detroit Red Wings 1954 {1} – 1954 – Trainer played 16 min when regular goalie got injured on Oct 10, 1953 (on cup in 1952, 1954, 1955 as a trainer)
Wilson, Scott – Pittsburgh Penguins 2017 {1}
Wilson, Tom - Washington Capitals 2018 {1}
 Winkler, Hal – Boston Bruins 1929 {1} – 1929 – spent whole season in minors, added to cup as a spare goalie in 1958.
 Wiseman, Eddie – Boston Bruins 1941 {1}
 Woit, Ben – Detroit Red Wings 1952-54-55 {3}
 Wolanin, Craig – Colorado Avalanche 1996 {1}
 Wood, E. Burke – Winnipeg Victorias 1901-02 {2}
 Wood, Frank – Ottawa Silver Sevens 1903 {1}
Worsley, Lorne "Gump" – Montreal Canadiens 1965-66-68-69 {4}
Wregget, Ken – Pittsburgh Penguins 1992 {1}

– Y – 
 Yelle, Stephane – Colorado Avalanche 1996-2001 {2}
 Young, Doug – Detroit Red Wings 1936–37 {2} – 1937 – played only 11 regular season games injured, so name was included.
 Young, Scott – Pittsburgh Penguins 1991; Colorado Avalanche 1996 {2}
 Young, Wendell – Pittsburgh Penguins 1991-92 {2} - 1992 - played 18 games, dressed for 35 included for spending the whole season with Pittsburgh
 Yzerman, Steve – Detroit Red Wings 1997-98-2002 {3}

– Z – 
 Zanier, Mike – Edmonton Oilers 1984 {1} – 1984 – dressed for 2 games in the finals, qualified, left off, because he had not played in the NHL.
 Zatkoff, Jeff – Pittsburgh Penguins 2016 {1} - 2016 - spent whole season with Pittsburgh. Requested to be included on cup.  Regular Season 14 games played, 59 games dressed.  Played 2 playoff games, dressed for first 7 games winning game #1. 
 Zeidel, Larry – Detroit Red Wings 1952 {1}
 Zelepukin, Valeri – New Jersey Devils 1995 {1}
 Zetterberg, Henrik – Detroit Red Wings 2008 {1}
 Zigomanis, Mike – Pittsburgh Penguins 2009 {1} – 2009 – Only played 22 regular season games injured, so name was included.
 Zubov, Sergei – New York Rangers 1994; Dallas Stars 1999 {2}

See also
 Stanley Cup (trophy)
 Stanley Cup ring
 Stanley Cup champions (teams)

References